= Grade II* listed buildings in Ashford (borough) =

Listed buildings in English district and borough

There are over 20,000 Grade II* listed buildings in England. This page is a list of these buildings in the district of Ashford in Kent.

== List of buildings ==
Name	Location	Type	Completed (Note: The date given is the date used by Historic England as significant for the initial building or that of an important part in the structure's description.)	Date designated	Grid ref. (Note: Sometimes known as OSGB36, the grid reference is based on the British national grid reference system used by the Ordnance Survey.) Geo-coordinates	Entry number (Note: The "List Entry Number" is a unique number assigned to each listed building and scheduled monument by Historic England.)	Image
Cobb's Hall	Aldington	Continuous jetty house	c.1525–30	13 October 1952	TR0666936276; 51°05′19″N 0°56′59″E	1184555	Cobb's Hall
Court Lodge Farmhouse	Aldington	Farmhouse	17th century	27 November 1957	TR0752036203; 51°05′15″N 0°57′42″E	1071209	Court Lodge Farmhouse
Ruffyn's Hill Farmhouse and walls projecting	Aldington	House	16th century or earlier	13 October 1952	TR0717036011; 51°05′10″N 0°57′24″E	1184521	Upload Photo
Horne's Place	Appledore	Box frame house	17th century	4 June 1952	TQ9574530870; 51°02′38″N 0°47′28″E	1362879	Horne's Place More images
Bridge House	Ashford	House	18th century	24 September 1951	TR0144042774; 51°08′56″N 0°52′44″E	1071079	Bridge House More images
Nightingale House	Ashford	House	18th century	24 September 1951	TR0127342767; 51°08′56″N 0°52′35″E	1071078	Nightingale House More images
The College	Ashford	Vicarage	Edward IV	24 September 1951	TR0106142703; 51°08′54″N 0°52′24″E	1184332	The College More images
The Doctor Wilks Memorial Hall	Ashford	Grammar school	1635	24 September 1951	TR0098042760; 51°08′56″N 0°52′20″E	1071118	The Doctor Wilks Memorial Hall More images
Whist House	Ashford	House	1707	24 September 1951	TR0134542465; 51°08′46″N 0°52′38″E	1299918	Upload Photo
22 North Street	Ashford	House	18th century	24 September 1951	TR0106842917; 51°09′01″N 0°52′25″E	1071037	22 North Street More images
91 High Street	Ashford	House	18th century	24 September 1951	TR0091042816; 51°08′58″N 0°52′16″E	1184508	91 High Street More images
51–55 High Street	Ashford	House	18th century	24 September 1951	TR0105142770; 51°08′56″N 0°52′24″E	1362831	51–55 High Street More images
Willesborough Windmill	Willesborough, Ashford	Windmill	1868	24 September 1951	TR0312942132; 51°08′33″N 0°54′09″E	1184561	Willesborough Windmill More images
Pimphurst Farmhouse	Bethersden	Farmhouse	Circa early 16th century	10 October 1980	TQ9252942129; 51°08′46″N 0°45′04″E	1070788	Upload Photo
Ring Cottage	Wissenden, Bethersden	Timber-framed house	15th century	14 February 1967	TQ9127541132; 51°08′15″N 0°43′58″E	1362987	Upload Photo
The Old House	Wissenden, Bethersden	Timber-framed house	15th century	14 February 1967	TQ9068141448; 51°08′26″N 0°43′28″E	1070764	The Old House More images
Tuesnoad Cottage	Tuesnoad, Bethersden	Farmhouse	16th century or earlier	14 February 1967	TQ9086242136; 51°08′48″N 0°43′39″E	1362986	Upload Photo
Biddenden Place	Biddenden	House	Dated 1624	4 June 1952	TQ8515838301; 51°06′51″N 0°38′38″E	1299500	Biddenden Place More images
Birchley Farmhouse	Biddenden	Farmhouse	16th century	16 August 1962	TQ8452537196; 51°06′16″N 0°38′04″E	1071005	Birchley Farmhouse More images
Castwisell Manor Farmhouse	Biddenden	Farmhouse	15th century	4 June 1952	TQ8348337466; 51°06′26″N 0°37′11″E	1184788	Upload Photo
Great Bachelors Hall	Biddenden	Timber-framed house	15th century	4 June 1952	TQ8326638496; 51°06′59″N 0°37′01″E	1070991	Upload Photo
Hendon Hall	Biddenden	House	Late 17th century	4 June 1952	TQ8509238330; 51°06′52″N 0°38′35″E	1070956	Hendon Hall
Standen	Standen, Biddenden	Guesthouse	15th century	16 August 1962	TQ8559140056; 51°07′47″N 0°39′04″E	1185339	Upload Photo
The Cott	Biddenden	House	c.1535	9 August 1979	TQ8556139355; 51°07′24″N 0°39′01″E	1071009	Upload Photo
Vane Court	Biddenden	Wealden house	15th century	9 August 1979	TQ8588740472; 51°08′00″N 0°39′20″E	1362899	Vane Court More images
Barn about 50 metres south-west of Court Lodge	Bilsington	Aisled barn	15th century	10 August 1988	TR0411534234; 51°04′16″N 0°54′44″E	1300006	Upload Photo
Church of St Peter and St Paul	Bilsington	Church	12th century	27 November 1957	TR0421634264; 51°04′17″N 0°54′49″E	1071191	Church of St Peter and St Paul More images
Boughton Court	Boughton Aluph	Manor house	16th century	13 October 1952	TR0328048209; 51°11′49″N 0°54′29″E	1362711	Upload Photo
The Hall	Brabourne	House	Early 18th century	13 October 1952	TR0884042546; 51°08′39″N 0°59′03″E	1232797	Upload Photo
Barn about 20 metres west	Brook	Barn	Mid-17th century	27 November 1957	TR0650342339; 51°08′35″N 0°57′03″E	1232968	Barn about 20 metres west
Court Lodge	Brook	House	15th century or earlier	27 November 1957	TR0663344231; 51°09′36″N 0°57′14″E	1276825	Upload Photo
Forstal Farmhouse	Brook	Farmhouse	17th century	27 November 1957	TR0623644003; 51°09′29″N 0°56′53″E	1232970	Upload Photo
Troy Town House and Wall	Troy Town, Brook	House	Late 17th century	15 March 1988	TR0711244354; 51°09′39″N 0°57′38″E	1232977	Troy Town House and Wall More images
Church of St Cosmas and St Damian	Challock	Church	1504	27 November 1957	TR0114449196; 51°12′24″N 0°52′41″E	1185088	Church of St Cosmas and St Damian More images
Great Paddock Farmhouse	Challock	Manor house	Early 17th century	27 November 1957	TQ9916150244; 51°13′00″N 0°51′01″E	1071302	Great Paddock Farmhouse
Laurenden Forstal, Nine Chimneys	Challock Lees, Challock	Jettied house	17th century	13 August 1984	TR0101250478; 51°13′05″N 0°52′37″E	1362736	Upload Photo
Brockton Manor	Charing Heath, Charing	House	18th century	14 February 1967	TQ9242449006; 51°12′28″N 0°45′12″E	1070774	Upload Photo
Chapel at Newlands Stud Farm	Charing	Chapel	Late Norman	17 September 1952	TQ9362748211; 51°12′01″N 0°46′12″E	1071538	Chapel at Newlands Stud Farm
Ludwell House	Charing	House	Early 18th century	17 September 1952	TQ9529449471; 51°12′40″N 0°47′41″E	1185767	Ludwell House More images
Newlands Stud Farmhouse	Charing	Farmhouse	Possibly late Norman	10 October 1980	TQ9368748185; 51°12′00″N 0°46′16″E	1071537	Upload Photo
Peirce House	Charing	House	13th century	17 September 1952	TQ9527249423; 51°12′38″N 0°47′40″E	1070742	Peirce House More images
Sherborne House	Charing	House	Mid-16th century	17 September 1952	TQ9527049387; 51°12′37″N 0°47′39″E	1070740	Sherborne House More images
The Old House	Charing	House	14th century	17 September 1952	TQ9519449236; 51°12′32″N 0°47′35″E	1186103	The Old House More images
The Old Vicarage, Vicarage Cottage	Charing	Vicarage	c.1702	14 February 1967	TQ9550149385; 51°12′37″N 0°47′51″E	1185849	The Old Vicarage, Vicarage Cottage
Tithe Barn to the south-east of Pett Place	Charing	Tithe barn	Medieval, refaced 17th century	14 February 1967	TQ9614348921; 51°12′21″N 0°48′23″E	1362628	Upload Photo
Tram Hatch	Charing	House	15th to 16th century	10 October 1980	TQ9234747474; 51°11′39″N 0°45′05″E	1070770	Upload Photo
Wakeley House	Charing	House	18th century	17 September 1952	TQ9533649517; 51°12′41″N 0°47′43″E	1070747	Wakeley House
Wickens Manor	Charing	House	16th century	17 September 1952	TQ9602348331; 51°12′02″N 0°48′16″E	1071548	Upload Photo
The Vicarage	Chilham	Vicarage	1746	13 October 1952	TR0694253682; 51°14′41″N 0°57′49″E	1071252	The Vicarage More images
Hunt Street Farmhouse	Crundale	Farmhouse	c.1595	13 October 1952	TR0906848592; 51°11′54″N 0°59′28″E	1185666	Upload Photo
Lake House	Eastwell	House	Late 13th century	13 October 1952	TR0101347326; 51°11′23″N 0°52′31″E	1362760	Lake House More images
Link House	Egerton	Timber-framed house	15th century	17 September 1952	TQ8976847207; 51°11′33″N 0°42′52″E	1071518	Link House More images
Court Lodge	Great Chart with Singleton	House	13th century	17 September 1952	TQ9791441934; 51°08′33″N 0°49′41″E	1362641	Court Lodge
Little Singleton	Great Chart with Singleton	Timber-framed house	16th century or earlier	14 February 1967	TQ9706141678; 51°08′26″N 0°48′56″E	1071474	Upload Photo
Singleton Manor	Great Chart with Singleton	Manor house	16th century or earlier	17 September 1952	TQ9888241647; 51°08′22″N 0°50′30″E	1116272	Upload Photo
Timber-framed building in the south-west corner of the churchyard of Church of St Mary (Pest House)	Great Chart with Singleton	Timber-framed house	16th century or earlier	14 February 1967	TQ9796041884; 51°08′31″N 0°49′43″E	1071488	Timber-framed building in the south-west corner of the churchyard of Church of St Mary (Pest House) More images
Yardhurst	Daniel's Water, Great Chart with Singleton	Timber-framed house	15th century	17 September 1952	TQ9557641172; 51°08′11″N 0°47′39″E	1071478	Upload Photo
South Hill and wall and steps attached	Hastingleigh	House	c.1640	27 November 1957	TR0960743995; 51°09′24″N 0°59′46″E	1276735	Upload Photo
Potkiln Farmhouse	Further Quarter, High Halden	Farmhouse	c.1600	16 August 1962	TQ8982439325; 51°07′18″N 0°42′40″E	1362889	Upload Photo
Swinford Manor School	Swinford, Hothfield	House	19th century	10 October 1980	TQ9751543725; 51°09′31″N 0°49′24″E	1115575	Upload Photo
Church of St Mary	Kenardington	Church	13th century	16 August 1962	TQ9747832132; 51°03′16″N 0°48′59″E	1116484	Church of St Mary More images
Manor Farmhouse	Kenardington	Farmhouse	16th century or earlier	4 June 1952	TQ9691732344; 51°03′24″N 0°48′31″E	1116469	Upload Photo
Calehill House	Calehill Park, Little Chart	House	Early 17th century	14 February 1967	TQ9416447142; 51°11′26″N 0°46′38″E	1071434	Upload Photo
Barn about 30 metres north-west of Mersham Manor	Mersham	Aisled barn	Early to mid-14th century	16 February 1989	TR0515839414; 51°07′02″N 0°55′48″E	1233497	Barn about 30 metres north-west of Mersham Manor
Bower Farmhouse	Mersham	Farmhouse	16th–18th century	27 November 1957	TR0565439388; 51°07′01″N 0°56′13″E	1276692	Upload Photo
Mill House, Swanton Mill	South Stour, Mersham	Mill house	16th century	27 November 1957	TR0388438856; 51°06′46″N 0°54′41″E	1276466	Upload Photo
Newhouse	Mersham	House	17th century	13 October 1952	TR0545039970; 51°07′20″N 0°56′04″E	1276324	Upload Photo
Stonegreen Hall	Mersham	House	1704	13 October 1952	TR0469938350; 51°06′28″N 0°55′22″E	1233498	Upload Photo
Stonelees	Mersham	Continuous jetty house	16th century	27 November 1957	TR0450837281; 51°05′54″N 0°55′10″E	1233761	Stonelees
Great Bower Farmhouse	Molash	Farmhouse	16th century	27 November 1957	TR0340852939; 51°14′22″N 0°54′45″E	1071242	Great Bower Farmhouse More images
Parish Church of St Peter	Newenden	Church	14th or 15th century	16 August 1962	TQ8343327306; 51°00′57″N 0°36′50″E	1116453	Parish Church of St Peter More images
Church of St Mary the Virgin	Orlestone	Church	Late 12th/early 13th century	27 November 1957	TR0001034696; 51°04′36″N 0°51′14″E	1184978	Church of St Mary the Virgin More images
Court Lodge	Orlestone	House	16th century	13 October 1952	TQ9998434641; 51°04′34″N 0°51′13″E	1184992	Court Lodge
Cooper Farmhouse	Pluckley	Farmhouse	15th century	14 February 1967	TQ9151743948; 51°09′46″N 0°44′16″E	1145835	Cooper Farmhouse More images
Dowle Street Cottages	Pluckley	Farmhouse	15th century	14 February 1967	TQ9357243757; 51°09′37″N 0°46′01″E	1318895	Upload Photo
Gore Court	Pluckley	Wealden house	15th century	14 February 1967	TQ9336644028; 51°09′46″N 0°45′51″E	1087078	Gore Court More images
Granary and oasthouse to the south-west of Sheerland Farmhouse	Pluckley	Oasthouse	1838	14 February 1967	TQ9335045456; 51°10′32″N 0°45′53″E	1335838	Granary and oasthouse to the south-west of Sheerland Farmhouse
Gatehouse to Great Maytham	Rolvenden	Gatehouse	Designed 1909–12	4 June 1952	TQ8489530730; 51°02′46″N 0°38′11″E	1070886	Gatehouse to Great Maytham More images
Great Maytham	Rolvenden	House	1721	4 June 1952	TQ8481930620; 51°02′43″N 0°38′07″E	1115477	Great Maytham More images
Kingpost	Rolvenden	House	18th century	4 June 1952	TQ8443531581; 51°03′14″N 0°37′49″E	1115555	Kingpost
Rawlinson Farmhouse	Hole Park, Rolvenden	Farmhouse	15th century	4 June 1952	TQ8390932650; 51°03′49″N 0°37′24″E	1362909	Upload Photo
Rolvenden Windmill	Rolvenden	Windmill	Site of mill of 1596	16 August 1962	TQ8381531537; 51°03′14″N 0°37′17″E	1116206	Rolvenden Windmill More images
2, 4 and 6 Hastings Road	Rolvenden	House	18th century	16 August 1962	TQ8447231258; 51°03′04″N 0°37′50″E	1070913	2, 4 and 6 Hastings Road
Church of St Peter and St Paul	Shadoxhurst	Church	13th century	14 February 1967	TQ9723737601; 51°06′14″N 0°48′57″E	1326649	Church of St Peter and St Paul More images
Biddenden Green Farmhouse	Smarden	Farmhouse	15th century	14 February 1967	TQ8878142867; 51°09′14″N 0°41′53″E	1362699	Biddenden Green Farmhouse More images
Chessenden	Smarden	Timber-framed house	15th century	17 September 1952	TQ8827042405; 51°09′00″N 0°41′26″E	1359673	Chessenden More images
Dragon Cottage	Smarden	Timber-framed house	15th century	17 September 1952	TQ8809642333; 51°08′58″N 0°41′17″E	1071360	Dragon Cottage More images
Hamden Grange	Smarden	House	14th century	17 September 1952	TQ8914340715; 51°08′04″N 0°42′08″E	1071368	Upload Photo
Hartnup House	Smarden	House	1671	17 September 1952	TQ8792342335; 51°08′58″N 0°41′08″E	1366291	Hartnup House More images
The Cloth Hall	Smarden	Farmhouse	16th century	17 September 1952	TQ8788742357; 51°08′59″N 0°41′06″E	1071366	The Cloth Hall More images
Bridge House/The Thatched House	Smarden	Hall house	15th century	14 February 1967	TQ8782242092; 51°08′50″N 0°41′02″E	1106331	Bridge House/The Thatched House More images
West Hoy Farmhouse	Smarden	Farmhouse	15th century	14 February 1967	TQ8608542329; 51°09′00″N 0°39′33″E	1071352	West Hoy Farmhouse
Evegate Manor	Smeeth	House	Early 17th century	27 November 1957	TR0682238975; 51°06′46″N 0°57′12″E	1362798	Upload Photo
Lodge House	Smeeth	House	Early 18th century	10 August 1988	TR0852039673; 51°07′06″N 0°58′41″E	1185326	Lodge House
Parish Church of St Mary the Virgin	Stone-cum-Ebony	Church	15th century; contains Roman altar	16 August 1962	TQ9401927347; 51°00′46″N 0°45′52″E	1362959	Parish Church of St Mary the Virgin More images
Ashenden	Tenterden	House	17th century	8 May 1950	TQ8945331428; 51°03′03″N 0°42′06″E	1362789	Ashenden
Chestnut House	Tenterden	House	18th century	8 May 1950	TQ8797832965; 51°03′55″N 0°40′53″E	1203483	Upload Photo
Church of St John the Baptist	Smallhythe, Tenterden	Church	Rebuilt 1516–17	8 May 1950	TQ8935530162; 51°02′23″N 0°41′59″E	1362790	Church of St John the Baptist More images
East Hill House	Tenterden	House	18th century	8 May 1950	TQ8884433657; 51°04′16″N 0°41′39″E	1031824	Upload Photo
Finchden Manor	Tenterden	House	1658 (dated feature)	8 May 1950	TQ9007933127; 51°03′58″N 0°42′41″E	1363181	Upload Photo
Garden turrets in grounds of Hales Place	Tenterden	Tower	Early 16th century	8 May 1950	TQ8886133489; 51°04′11″N 0°41′39″E	1362822	Upload Photo
Hales Place	Tenterden	House	Early 16th century	8 May 1950	TQ8884733400; 51°04′08″N 0°41′39″E	1071143	Upload Photo
Maynard's Farmhouse	Tenterden	Farmhouse	Late 14th century	8 June 1972	TQ9015833068; 51°03′56″N 0°42′45″E	1070383	Maynard's Farmhouse More images
Old Knockwood	Tenterden	Jettied house	16th century	8 May 1950	TQ8972634276; 51°04′35″N 0°42′25″E	1071130	Upload Photo
Pigeon Hoo	Tenterden	Farmhouse	Early 15th century	8 May 1950	TQ9084933576; 51°04′11″N 0°43′22″E	1071151	Pigeon Hoo
Priest's House	Small Hythe, Tenterden	Jettied house	15th century	8 May 1950	TQ8934230146; 51°02′22″N 0°41′58″E	1281677	Priest's House More images
Smallhythe Place	Small Hythe, Tenterden	Jettied house	15th century	8 May 1950	TQ8934229997; 51°02′17″N 0°41′58″E	1071163	Smallhythe Place More images
The Cedars	Tenterden	House	18th century	8 May 1950	TQ8805632911; 51°03′53″N 0°40′57″E	1071121	Upload Photo
The White House	Tenterden	House	18th century	8 May 1950	TQ8859433695; 51°04′18″N 0°41′26″E	1070394	Upload Photo
Westfield House	Tenterden	Apartment	Early 18th century	8 May 1950	TQ8791033109; 51°04′00″N 0°40′50″E	1071128	Upload Photo
Westwell	Tenterden	Country house	1711	8 May 1950	TQ8771033064; 51°03′58″N 0°40′40″E	1071156	Upload Photo
29, 31 and 33 High Street	Tenterden	Jettied house	16th century	8 May 1950	TQ8842333329; 51°04′06″N 0°41′17″E	1025841	29, 31 and 33 High Street More images
15 and 17 East Cross	Tenterden	House	18th century	8 May 1950	TQ8855433542; 51°04′13″N 0°41′24″E	1070364	15 and 17 East Cross
Leacon Hall	Warehorne	House	1708	10 August 1988	TQ9866333087; 51°03′46″N 0°50′02″E	1185579	Leacon Hall More images
Digges Court	Westwell	Hall house	16th century and later	10 October 1980	TQ9732447780; 51°11′43″N 0°49′22″E	1071333	Digges Court
The Stocks Windmill	Wittersham	Windmill	Dated 1781	4 June 1952	TQ9130427305; 51°00′48″N 0°43′33″E	1323124	The Stocks Windmill More images
Diamond House	Woodchurch	House	Late 16th century to early 17th century	9 August 1979	TQ9249633692; 51°04′13″N 0°44′46″E	1362980	Diamond House
Hendon Place	The Green, Woodchurch	Clothiers house	15th century	4 June 1952	TQ9437334911; 51°04′50″N 0°46′25″E	1121861	Hendon Place More images
Robhurst	Woodchurch	Wealden house	16th century or earlier	16 August 1962	TQ9182534657; 51°04′45″N 0°44′14″E	1337002	Upload Photo
Shirley Farmhouse	Woodchurch	Farmhouse	16th century or earlier	9 August 1979	TQ9318332532; 51°03′35″N 0°45′19″E	1123740	Upload Photo
Woodchurch Windmill	Woodchurch	Windmill	Early 18th century	16 August 1962	TQ9430335215; 51°05′00″N 0°46′22″E	1121143	Woodchurch Windmill More images
Old Swan House	Wye with Hinxhill	Continuous jetty house	15th century	27 November 1957	TR0526446706; 51°10′58″N 0°56′08″E	1365318	Old Swan House More images
Spring Grove and walled garden attached	Wye with Hinxhill	House	1674	13 October 1952	TR0425046687; 51°10′58″N 0°55′16″E	1216831	Upload Photo
The Old Flying Horse Inn	Wye with Hinxhill	House	16th century	27 November 1957	TR0548046804; 51°11′01″N 0°56′20″E	1216805	The Old Flying Horse Inn More images
The Old Manor House	Wye with Hinxhill	House	Late 16th century	27 November 1957	TR0541346815; 51°11′01″N 0°56′16″E	1216736	Upload Photo
The Wheel House (Junior Common Room), walls and gates attached	Wye with Hinxhill	House	15th century	27 November 1957	TR0549246833; 51°11′02″N 0°56′20″E	1275530	The Wheel House (Junior Common Room), walls and gates attached More images
Wye Bridge	Wye with Hinxhill	Bridge	1638	13 October 1952	TR0486446920; 51°11′05″N 0°55′48″E	1234208	Wye Bridge More images
Yew Trees	Wye with Hinxhill	Continuous jetty house	c.1600	13 October 1952	TR0570946760; 51°10′59″N 0°56′31″E	1217546	Yew Trees More images

== See also ==
- Grade I listed buildings in Ashford (borough)
