= Hampton Charles =

Hampton Charles may refer to:

- Hampton Charles, Herefordshire
- Hampton Charles, pseudonym of Roy Peter Martin writing three of the Miss Seeton mysteries

== See also ==
- Charles Hampton (disambiguation)
