= Heron Carvic =

British actor and writer (1913–1980)

- Carvic circa 1968
- Born: Geoffrey Richard William Harris; 21 January 1913; Marylebone, London, England
- Died: 9 February 1980 (aged 67); Ashford, Kent, England
- Occupations: Actor, writer
- Years active: 1934-1964
- Spouse: Phyllis Neilson-Terry (m. 1958-1977; her death)

Heron Carvic (born Geoffrey Richard William Harris; 21 January 1913 – 9 February 1980) was an English actor and writer who provided the voice for Gandalf in the BBC Radio version of The Hobbit, and played Caiaphas the High Priest every time the play cycle The Man Born to Be King was broadcast. He also authored the five original Miss Seeton books featuring retired art teacher Miss Emily D. Seeton, a gentle parody of Agatha Christie's Miss Marple.

Seriously injured in an automobile accident near his home at Appledore, Kent, in August 1979, he never fully recovered and died in hospital the following February, despite having an operation and spending time in intensive care, dying from pneumonia.

== Books ==
The Mystery Writers of America nominated the first of the five Miss Seeton books, titled Picture Miss Seeton, for an Edgar Award for Best Novel in 1969 and for Best Book Jacket in 1971. The five Miss Seeton books were made available as eBooks in 2016.

Ten years after Carvic's death, his books were re-issued in the US and proved sufficiently popular for his Estate to commission further Miss Seeton stories from two other writers using pseudonyms with the initials "HC". Roy Peter Martin as "Hampton Charles" wrote three novels, which were all released in 1990. Sarah J. Mason, writing as "Hamilton Crane", then took up the series.

== Early life ==
Carvic ran away from Eton, and his father, to travel to France to earn a living for himself, and took his stage name as it derived from his grandmother but would "spare the sensibilities of his outraged family". He met Phyllis Neilson-Terry when he was 23 (she was 20 years older), but they did not marry until 1958, when the register of marriages in July, August, and September lists Phyllis J King marrying both Heron Carvic and Geoffrey Harris.

== Filmography ==
- Honeymoon for Three (1935)
- Doctor Who ... as Morpho (voice) in the serial The Keys of Marinus
- The Avengers ... as Five in episode "Square Root of Evil"
- Police Surgeon ... as Barrister in episode "Under the Influence"

== Bibliography ==
- Picture Miss Seeton (1968)
- Miss Seeton Draws the Line (1969)
- Miss Seeton, Bewitched (1971) (US Title: Witch Miss Seeton)
- Miss Seeton Sings (1973)
- Odds on Miss Seeton (1975)
