= The Man Born to Be King =

1941 radio drama by Dorothy Sayers

The Man Born to Be King is a radio drama based on the life of Jesus, produced and broadcast by the BBC during the Second World War. It is a play cycle consisting of twelve plays depicting specific periods in Jesus' life, from the events surrounding his birth to his death and resurrection. It was first broadcast by the BBC Home Service on Sunday evenings, beginning on 21 December 1941, with new episodes broadcast at 4-week intervals, ending on 18 October 1942. The series was written by novelist and dramatist Dorothy L. Sayers, and produced by Val Gielgud, with Robert Speaight as Jesus.

The twelve plays in the cycle are:

1. Kings in Judea
2. The King's Herald
3. A Certain Nobleman
4. The Heirs to the Kingdom
5. The Bread of Heaven
6. The Feast of Tabernacles
7. The Light and the Life
8. Royal Progress
9. The King's Supper
10. The Princes of This World
11. King of Sorrows
12. The King Comes to His Own

The project aroused a storm of controversy, even before it was broadcast. Objections arose to the very idea—atheists complained of Christian propaganda, while devout Christians declared that the BBC would be committing blasphemy by allowing the Christ to be impersonated by a human actor—and also to Sayers' approach to the material. Sayers, who felt that the inherent drama of the Gospel story had become muffled by familiarity and a general failure to think of its characters as real people, was determined to give the plays dramatic immediacy, featuring realistic, identifiable characters with human emotions, motivations, and speech-patterns. The decision to have the characters speak in contemporary colloquial English was, by itself, the cause of much disquiet among those more accustomed to Jesus and his followers using the polished and formal words of the King James Bible.

In the event, although it continued to be criticised by some conservative Christians—one group going so far as to proclaim the Fall of Singapore in February 1942 to be a sign of God's displeasure with the series—The Man Born to Be King was generally considered a great success, both as drama and as biblical representation. The public reaction to the series is described by J. W. Welch, the Director of Religious Broadcasting B.B.C., in his foreword to the play scripts. These were first published in 1943, with Sayers' lengthy introduction, illuminating her attitude to the work and the reasoning behind particular aspects of her dramatisation, and with notes and commentary by the author on each of the twelve plays. The book of the scripts was published in its 22nd impression in 1957, and subsequently.

== Other versions ==
In April 1944 Episodes 8, 9, 10, 11 and 12 were repeated as a Crucifixion/Resurrection sequence for Easter Week. Again Gielgud produced and Speaight was Jesus, but they were done afresh – for instance, Deryck Guyler played the disciple Andrew which he had not before.

Four other full versions were made by the BBC:

1. Directed by Noel Iliff 1947–48, with Raf de la Torre as Jesus
2. Directed by Peter Watts 23 December 1951, with Deryck Guyler as Jesus
3. Directed by William Glen-Doepel 17 February 1965, with Tom Fleming as Jesus
4. Directed by Raymond Raikes World Service 1967, first aired domestically 19 January 1975

The last version was the first in stereo. It starred John Westbrook as Jesus, Gabriel Woolf, Denys Blakelock, Denise Bryer, Trevor Martin, Norman Shelley and Robert Eddison. This version was repeated from 6–21 December 2007 on BBC 7, after Christmas in 2008–2009 and from 18 April – 3 May 2011 on BBC7's replacement, BBC Radio 4 Extra.

The Raymond Raikes production reduced the episodes from one hour to forty-five minutes, and condensed the casts in various ways—for instance by making The Evangelist, the narrator figure, the same voice as John the disciple (an identification strongly supported by the text of the fifth play).

Heron Carvic, originally suggested by the writer, played Caiaphas in every version of the cycle (as well as in the broadcast of Sayers' Lichfield Passion The Just Vengeance in 1947). Alan Wheatley played Judas in all but the 1965 production. Similarly John Laurie played his original parts of Gestas in four of the productions, and John the Baptist in three. Many other castings overlapped — Raf de la Torre, a regular in Sayers' religious plays, was Jesus in the first full revival, and then had small parts in both of the 1960s productions.

No copies of the original version are held by the BBC, although recordings do exist elsewhere—only "King of Sorrows" from the original broadcast is completely missing. The 1951/2 version is held on vinyl at the British Library.
