= Listed buildings in Challock =

Historic structures in Kent, England

Challock is a village and civil parish in the Borough of Ashford of Kent, England. It contains one grade I, one grade II* and 43 grade II listed buildings that are recorded in the National Heritage List for England.

This list is based on the information retrieved online from Historic England.

== Key ==
Grade	Criteria
I	Buildings that are of exceptional interest
II*	Particularly important buildings of more than special interest
II	Buildings that are of special interest

== Listing ==
Name	Grade	Location	Type	Completed (Note: The date given is the date used by Historic England as significant for the initial building or that of an important part in the structure's description.)	Date designated	Grid ref. (Note: The grid reference is based on the British national grid reference system, sometimes known as OSGB36, used by the Ordnance Survey.) Geo-coordinates	Notes	Entry number (Note: The "List Entry Number" is a unique number assigned to each listed building and scheduled monument by Historic England.)	Image	Wikidata
Milestone	II				6 March 2001	TR0126750577; 51°13′08″N 0°52′50″E		1246645	Upload Photo	Q26539043
Barn 20 Yards South of Nine Chimneys	II	Blind Lane, Challock Lees			13 August 1984	TR0102850453; 51°13′04″N 0°52′38″E		1071294	Upload Photo	Q26326392
Berwick Cottage	II	Blind Lane, Challock Lees			13 August 1984	TR0094150509; 51°13′06″N 0°52′33″E		1362737	Upload Photo	Q26644607
Laurenden Forstal Nine Chimneys	II*	Blind Lane, Challock Lees			13 August 1984	TR0101250478; 51°13′05″N 0°52′37″E		1362736	Upload Photo	Q17556906
Rattle Hall	II	Buckstreet, Rattle Hall			13 August 1984	TR0195450210; 51°12′55″N 0°53′25″E		1071295	Upload Photo	Q26326394
Barn Farm Shop	II	Canterbury Road, Challock Lees			13 August 1984	TR0093850671; 51°13′12″N 0°52′34″E		1071296	Upload Photo	Q26326396
Clockhouse	II	Canterbury Road, Challock Lees			13 August 1984	TR0087550638; 51°13′11″N 0°52′30″E		1071297	Upload Photo	Q26326397
Crossways	II	Canterbury Road, Challock Lees			13 August 1984	TR0105850834; 51°13′17″N 0°52′40″E		1362738	Upload Photo	Q26644608
Cattes Cottage Corner Cottage	II	Church Lane, Challock Lees			13 August 1984	TR0087850506; 51°13′06″N 0°52′30″E		1071298	Upload Photo	Q26326400
Church Cottages	II	Church Lane			13 August 1984	TR0105349295; 51°12′27″N 0°52′37″E		1362739	Upload Photo	Q26644609
Church of St Cosmas and St Damian	II*	Church Lane			27 November 1957	TR0114449196; 51°12′24″N 0°52′41″E		1185088	Church of St Cosmas and St Damian More images	Q17556377
Cosy Cottages	II	2, Church Lane, Challock Lees			13 August 1984	TR0092250508; 51°13′06″N 0°52′33″E		1185076	Upload Photo	Q26480384
Ivy Farm Stables to Rear of House	II	Church Lane, Challock Lees			13 August 1984	TR0090850413; 51°13′03″N 0°52′32″E		1071299	Upload Photo	Q26326402
Ivy Farmhouse	II	Church Lane, Challock Lees			13 August 1984	TR0089450418; 51°13′03″N 0°52′31″E		1299803	Upload Photo	Q26587165
Laurenden Cottage	II	Church Lane, Challock Lees			13 August 1984	TR0096050449; 51°13′04″N 0°52′34″E		1362740	Upload Photo	Q26644610
The Chequers	II	Church Lane, Challock Lees			13 August 1984	TR0089350507; 51°13′06″N 0°52′31″E		1185103	The Chequers More images	Q26480411
Biggin Farm Cottage	II	Faversham Road, Pested			13 August 1984	TR0055451982; 51°13′54″N 0°52′17″E		1071300	Upload Photo	Q26326403
Green Lane Farmhouse	II	Green Lane			13 August 1984	TR0001050793; 51°13′17″N 0°51′46″E		1185125	Upload Photo	Q26480439
Yew Tree Cottage	II	Green Lane, Paddock			13 August 1984	TQ9958050333; 51°13′02″N 0°51′23″E		1362741	Upload Photo	Q26644611
Hegdale Farmhouse	II	Hegdale Lane			13 August 1984	TR0104052307; 51°14′04″N 0°52′42″E		1299811	Upload Photo	Q26587172
Barn 15 Yards East of Little Pested Farm	II	Pested Lane			13 August 1984	TR0068751932; 51°13′53″N 0°52′23″E		1071303	Upload Photo	Q26326406
Barn 20 Yards West of Great Pested Farm	II	Pested Lane			13 August 1984	TR0032551988; 51°13′55″N 0°52′05″E		1185146	Upload Photo	Q26480460
Little Pested Farmhouse	II	Pested Lane			13 August 1984	TR0065751936; 51°13′53″N 0°52′22″E		1299817	Upload Photo	Q26587177
Beech Court	II	The Lees			13 August 1984	TQ9995350017; 51°12′52″N 0°51′42″E		1299812	Upload Photo	Q26587173
Swan Lees Cottage	II	The Lees			13 August 1984	TR0075750418; 51°13′04″N 0°52′24″E		1071301	Upload Photo	Q26326405
Great Paddock Farmhouse	II*	The Paddock, Paddock			27 November 1957	TQ9916150244; 51°13′00″N 0°51′01″E		1071302	Upload Photo	Q17556178

== See also ==
- Grade I listed buildings in Kent
- Grade II* listed buildings in Kent

== Sources ==
- Newman, John (2012) [1969], Kent: West and the Weald, The Buildings of England, New Haven and London: Yale University Press, ISBN 978-0-300-18509-6
