= Listed buildings in Woodchurch, Kent =

Civil Parish in Kent, England

Woodchurch is a village and civil parish in the Borough of Ashford of Kent, England. It contains one grade I, five grade II* and 62 grade II listed buildings that are recorded in the National Heritage List for England.

This list is based on the information retrieved online from Historic England.

== Key ==
Grade	Criteria
I	Buildings that are of exceptional interest
II*	Particularly important buildings of more than special interest
II	Buildings that are of special interest

== Listing ==
Name	Grade	Location	Type	Completed (Note: The date given is the date used by Historic England as significant for the initial building or that of an important part in the structure's description.)	Date designated	Grid ref. (Note: The grid reference is based on the British national grid reference system, sometimes known as OSGB36, used by the Ordnance Survey.) Geo-coordinates	Notes	Entry number (Note: The "List Entry Number" is a unique number assigned to each listed building and scheduled monument by Historic England.)	Image	Wikidata
Fair View Mill Cottage	II				9 August 1979	TQ9427335278; 51°05′02″N 0°46′21″E		1070862	Upload Photo	Q26325406
Hylands Row	II	1-5			9 August 1979	TQ9429734958; 51°04′52″N 0°46′21″E		1070861	Upload Photo	Q26325404
May Farmhouse	II				30 September 1992	TQ9561535616; 51°05′11″N 0°47′30″E		1362969	Upload Photo	Q26644828
Myrtle Cottage	II				9 August 1979	TQ9432934943; 51°04′51″N 0°46′23″E		1121140	Upload Photo	Q26414322
Outbuilding at Shirkoak to South of House	II				9 August 1979	TQ9433736077; 51°05′28″N 0°46′25″E		1362957	Upload Photo	Q26644817
Parish Church of All Saints	I				16 August 1962	TQ9419334916; 51°04′50″N 0°46′16″E		1362956	Parish Church of All Saints More images	Q17529453
Plurenden Manor	II				16 August 1962	TQ9302737386; 51°06′12″N 0°45′21″E		1121121	Upload Photo	Q26414303
Shirkoak	II				9 August 1979	TQ9433736099; 51°05′29″N 0°46′25″E		1121155	Upload Photo	Q86839043
The Bonny Cravat Inn	II				9 August 1979	TQ9424134985; 51°04′53″N 0°46′18″E		1120794	The Bonny Cravat Inn More images	Q26414002
The Six Bells Inn	II				9 August 1979	TQ9427234976; 51°04′52″N 0°46′20″E		1070860	The Six Bells Inn More images	Q26325401
Woodchurch Windmill	II*				16 August 1962	TQ9430335215; 51°05′00″N 0°46′22″E		1121143	Upload Photo	Q6693619
Hornbrook	II	Appledore Road			9 August 1979	TQ9492833103; 51°03′51″N 0°46′50″E		1070819	Upload Photo	Q26325292
Walter House	II	Appledore Road			9 August 1979	TQ9509933668; 51°04′09″N 0°47′00″E		1070820	Upload Photo	Q26325295
Great Engeham Manor	II	Bethersden Road			16 August 1962	TQ9426837621; 51°06′18″N 0°46′25″E		1362977	Upload Photo	Q26644836
Barn to South West of Cherry Gardens	II	Brook Street			9 August 1979	TQ9195634134; 51°04′28″N 0°44′19″E		1122647	Upload Photo	Q26415767
Brook Farmhouse	II	Brook Street			9 August 1979	TQ9391233691; 51°04′11″N 0°45′59″E		1362979	Upload Photo	Q26644838
Cherry Gardens	II	Brook Street			9 August 1979	TQ9198434150; 51°04′28″N 0°44′21″E		1362981	Upload Photo	Q26644839
Counter Farmhouse	II	Brook Street			9 August 1979	TQ9439533392; 51°04′01″N 0°46′23″E		1070821	Upload Photo	Q26325298
Dene House	II	Brook Street			9 August 1979	TQ9405233602; 51°04′08″N 0°46′06″E		1362978	Upload Photo	Q26644837
Diamond House	II*	Brook Street			9 August 1979	TQ9249633692; 51°04′13″N 0°44′46″E		1362980	Upload Photo	Q17556948
Malthouse Farmhouse	II	Brook Street			16 August 1962	TQ9386433627; 51°04′09″N 0°45′56″E		1070822	Upload Photo	Q26325301
Oakhurst	II	Brook Street			9 August 1979	TQ9333533804; 51°04′16″N 0°45′30″E		1070823	Upload Photo	Q26325304
Old Balcony	II	Brook Street			9 August 1979	TQ9296333753; 51°04′14″N 0°45′10″E		1070824	Upload Photo	Q26325307
The Cot	II	Brook Street			9 August 1979	TQ9199133922; 51°04′21″N 0°44′21″E		1070825	Upload Photo	Q26325309
Beacon Farmhouse	II	Coldblow Area			9 August 1979	TQ9634935051; 51°04′52″N 0°48′07″E		1070826	Upload Photo	Q26325313
Small Profits	II	Coldblow Area			9 August 1979	TQ9632835312; 51°05′01″N 0°48′06″E		1121919	Upload Photo	Q26415060
Dale Farmhouse	II	Frogs Hole			9 August 1979	TQ9249835266; 51°05′04″N 0°44′49″E		1070827	Upload Photo	Q26325316
22-28, Front Road	II	22-28, Front Road			16 August 1962	TQ9424434848; 51°04′48″N 0°46′18″E		1070832	Upload Photo	Q26325331
3 and 5, Front Street	II	3 and 5, Front Road, TN26 3QF			9 August 1979	TQ9429534927; 51°04′51″N 0°46′21″E		1122643	Upload Photo	Q26415764
32 and 34, Front Road	II	32 and 34, Front Road			9 August 1979	TQ9424034813; 51°04′47″N 0°46′18″E		1121915	Upload Photo	Q26415056
36, Front Road	II	36, Front Road			9 August 1979	TQ9423734798; 51°04′47″N 0°46′18″E		1070833	Upload Photo	Q26325334
43-49, Front Road	II	43-49, Front Road			9 August 1979	TQ9423734562; 51°04′39″N 0°46′17″E		1121931	Upload Photo	Q26415073
Church Gates	II	10, Front Road			9 August 1979	TQ9425634911; 51°04′50″N 0°46′19″E		1121936	Upload Photo	Q26415078
Court Lodge Farmhouse	II	Front Road			16 August 1962	TQ9412834703; 51°04′44″N 0°46′12″E		1070834	Upload Photo	Q26325336
Janes Quaintways the Little House	II	14 and 16, Front Road			9 August 1979	TQ9424834869; 51°04′49″N 0°46′19″E		1338564	Upload Photo	Q26622878
Lilac Cottage	II	2, Front Road			9 August 1979	TQ9426734923; 51°04′51″N 0°46′20″E		1070830	Upload Photo	Q26325325
Old School House	II	12, Front Road			16 August 1962	TQ9424234887; 51°04′50″N 0°46′18″E		1070831	Upload Photo	Q26325328
Park Farmhouse	II	79, Front Road			9 August 1979	TQ9443934430; 51°04′34″N 0°46′28″E		1070829	Upload Photo	Q26325322
Thorne House	II	21 and 23, Front Road			9 August 1979	TQ9426734670; 51°04′42″N 0°46′19″E		1070828	Upload Photo	Q26325319
Townland Farmhouse	II	80, Front Road			9 August 1979	TQ9420234487; 51°04′37″N 0°46′15″E		1121882	Upload Photo	Q26415023
Village Pump	II	Front Road			9 August 1979	TQ9429534849; 51°04′48″N 0°46′21″E		1338537	Upload Photo	Q26622852
Mayshaves Farmhouse	II	Harlakenden Road			9 August 1979	TQ9502537999; 51°06′29″N 0°47′05″E		1070835	Upload Photo	Q26325339
The White House	II	45, Lower Road			9 August 1979	TQ9460934365; 51°04′32″N 0°46′36″E		1121887	Upload Photo	Q26415028
Shirley Farmhouse	II*	Moor Lane			9 August 1979	TQ9318332532; 51°03′35″N 0°45′19″E		1123740	Upload Photo	Q17556318
Apple Field	II	Redbrook Street			9 August 1979	TQ9335136120; 51°05′30″N 0°45′35″E		1070839	Upload Photo	Q26325351
Beales Farmhouse	II	Redbrook Street			9 August 1979	TQ9330836160; 51°05′32″N 0°45′33″E		1337679	Upload Photo	Q26622072
Boldshaves Cottage	II	Redbrook Street			9 August 1979	TQ9234635576; 51°05′14″N 0°44′42″E		1123717	Upload Photo	Q26416808
Church Elms Farm	II	Redbrook Street, TN26 3QR			16 August 1962	TQ9357936034; 51°05′27″N 0°45′46″E		1362946	Upload Photo	Q26644807
King Farmhouse	II	Redbrook Street			9 August 1979	TQ9371036064; 51°05′28″N 0°45′53″E		1337677	Upload Photo	Q26622071
Maywood Farmhouse	II	Redbrook Street			9 August 1979	TQ9258235908; 51°05′25″N 0°44′55″E		1070840	Upload Photo	Q26325353
Redbrook Cottage	II	Redbrook Street			9 August 1979	TQ9315636157; 51°05′32″N 0°45′25″E		1123749	Upload Photo	Q26416847
Coleham Green	II	Shadoxhurst Road			9 August 1979	TQ9581637449; 51°06′10″N 0°47′44″E		1070841	Upload Photo	Q26325355
Frightsbridge Farmhouse	II	Shadoxhurst Road			9 August 1979	TQ9619537729; 51°06′19″N 0°48′04″E		1362967	Upload Photo	Q26644826
Granary at Henghurst	II	Shadoxhurst Road			9 August 1979	TQ9518836474; 51°05′40″N 0°47′10″E		1362947	Upload Photo	Q26644808
Brickwall Farmhouse	II	Susans Hill			9 August 1979	TQ9382935169; 51°04′59″N 0°45′58″E		1123703	Upload Photo	Q26416772
Oakmead Farm	II	Susans Hill, TN26 3RF			9 August 1979	TQ9347335043; 51°04′55″N 0°45′39″E		1337696	Upload Photo	Q26622087
Stonebridgelands	II	Susans Hill			9 August 1979	TQ9455034005; 51°04′21″N 0°46′32″E		1070800	Upload Photo	Q26325236
Great Robhurst Farmhouse	II	Swain Road			9 August 1979	TQ9180034699; 51°04′46″N 0°44′13″E		1362968	Upload Photo	Q26644827
Robhurst	II*	Swain Road			16 August 1962	TQ9195034559; 51°04′42″N 0°44′20″E		1337002	Upload Photo	Q17556883
Stonebridge Farmhouse	II	Tenterden Road			9 August 1979	TQ9453333884; 51°04′17″N 0°46′31″E		1070801	Upload Photo	Q26325239
19, the Green	II	19, The Green			16 August 1962	TQ9442134868; 51°04′49″N 0°46′27″E		1070836	Upload Photo	Q26325342
5, the Green	II	5, The Green			9 August 1979	TQ9429934912; 51°04′50″N 0°46′21″E		1362982	Upload Photo	Q26644840
Chequer Tree	II	The Green			9 August 1979	TQ9454434748; 51°04′45″N 0°46′34″E		1070837	Upload Photo	Q26325345
Cherry Tree Cottage the White House Wistaria Cottage	II	27, The Green			9 August 1979	TQ9452334806; 51°04′47″N 0°46′33″E		1362945	Upload Photo	Q26644806
Clappers Mead	II	TN26 3QL, The Green			16 August 1962	TQ9401735117; 51°04′57″N 0°46′07″E		1070838	Upload Photo	Q26325348
Henden Place	II*	15, The Green, TN26 3PF			4 June 1952	TQ9437334911; 51°04′50″N 0°46′25″E		1121861	Henden Place More images	Q17556310
Place Farmhouse	II	39, The Green			16 August 1962	TQ9459134810; 51°04′47″N 0°46′36″E		1123735	Upload Photo	Q26416835
Prospect House	II	23, The Green			9 August 1979	TQ9446834843; 51°04′48″N 0°46′30″E		1121869	Upload Photo	Q26415012

== See also ==
- Grade I listed buildings in Kent
- Grade II* listed buildings in Kent

== Sources ==
- Newman, John (2012) [1969], Kent: West and the Weald, The Buildings of England, New Haven and London: Yale University Press, ISBN 978-0-300-18509-6
