= Appledore, Kent =

Village in Kent, England

Coordinates: 51.030°N 0.789°E

Appledore
- Village
- Appledore Bridge carries the B2080 over the Royal Military Canal

- Location within Kent
- Area: 12.46 km^{2} (4.81 sq mi)
- Population: 832 (Civil Parish 2021)
  - Density: 67/km^{2} (170/sq mi)
- OS grid reference: TQ956295
- Civil parish: Appledore
- District: Ashford
- Shire county: Kent
- Region: South East
- Country: England
- Sovereign state: United Kingdom
- Post town: ASHFORD
- Postcode district: TN26
- Dialling code: 01233
- Police: Kent
- Fire: Kent
- Ambulance: South East Coast
- UK Parliament: Weald of Kent

Appledore is a village and civil parish in the Ashford District of Kent, England. The village centre is on the northern edge of the Romney Marsh, 12 miles (19 km) south-west of Ashford town. The northerly part of this village is Appledore Heath.

== Etymology ==
Appledore is first recorded within the Doomsday Book as apuldre (meaning apple tree in Old English). Alternatively, a Brythonic origin of "dwr/dor" has been proposed, which means water and would refer to the village’s connection to the River Rother as a historic port.

== History ==
=== Middle ages ===
In 2015, two fragmented ancient roman pottery shards dating between 75 AD and 150 AD was identified in during archeological monitoring In 892 AD, coming from Boulogne, a Danish fleet of 250 ships and 5000 men docked along the River Limen (River Rother). The danish men built fortification for the winter and launched an incursion into Wessex the following Spring. In 1997, A hoard of Anglo-Saxon coins was found near Appledore by metal detectors. Over 34 mints were represented, and the first known coin mints from Sandwich and Romney Marsh was found. The hoard was likely buried between 1051 to 1052.

In 1086, the village was be recorded in the Doomsday Book. A church is recorded, but no stonework of the period can identify it to St Peter and St Paul. The village held a population of roughly 300: 78 households, 37 villagers and 41 smallholders. Around 2 acres of meadows recorded, and a woodland that supported around 6 swine. In total, the land brought a value of 16 pounds 17 shillings and 5 pence to its lord. Violent storms hit Appledore. The first documented storm struck in 1236 and caused coastal flooding. In October 1250, a second hit. ‘Very violent and extraordinary in nature’ described by chroniclers.

The storms caused a breach in the shingle barrier, and the River Rother gradually began to slit. By 1258, the River Rother reached as far Appledore. The Rhee Canal was dug up, and stretched 12.07 kilometres (7.5 miles) between Appledore to New Romney. The storm of 1287 swept shingle across the channel mouth at Romney and resulted in floodung. The overflow to the River Rother changed course from Appledore to just a few miles east of Rye.

Dated to the 13th century, a lead seal matrix of 22.86 millimetres (0.9 inches) in diameter was found in 1981. Inscribed upon it is S'PhILIRIChAIVN (Seal of Philip Richaiun) Between 1314 and 1316, Appledore had around 55 shops, with stalls beside them. The manorial income from renting spaces was 18 shillings. Land behind the stalls became derelict by 1335. In 1349, the black death hit, and stated of a tax collecter ‘Nine shillings received from the shops in the town and no more because all the holders who used to be there are dead’

King Edward III granted a weekly market and annual fair in 1359, which was held until the end of the 14th century. During the Hundreds’ Year War, in 1380, the French army sailed upriver and pillaged Appledore. The following year, inhabitants joined the Peasants Revolt led by Wat Tyler. The force broke into Horne’s Place, the house of William de Horne, and stole goods worth 10 pounds. Jack Cade and his army marched through the village in 1450, wanting to reform the government of Henry VI.

=== Modern era ===
Monks let out Court Lodge to well-off Yeomen, who could be self-sufficient and work the land. Dated 1513, a lease recalls the property let of Lodge Court and a farm to William Brockhill. In his later will in 1520, he left an endowment to pay towards a school. He left provisions of the cost for a priest to teach for perpetuity. Funds in 1523 went towards building a conduit carrying running water to the market. In 1583, Queen Elizabeth I became a tenant of Appledore Manor.

In October 1804, construction began on the Royal Military Canal due to the rising threat of Napoleon. Construction work was done by civilians and Militia units working on ramparts while turfing the banks. It took between 1808 and 1809 for the Royal Military Canal to be fully completed

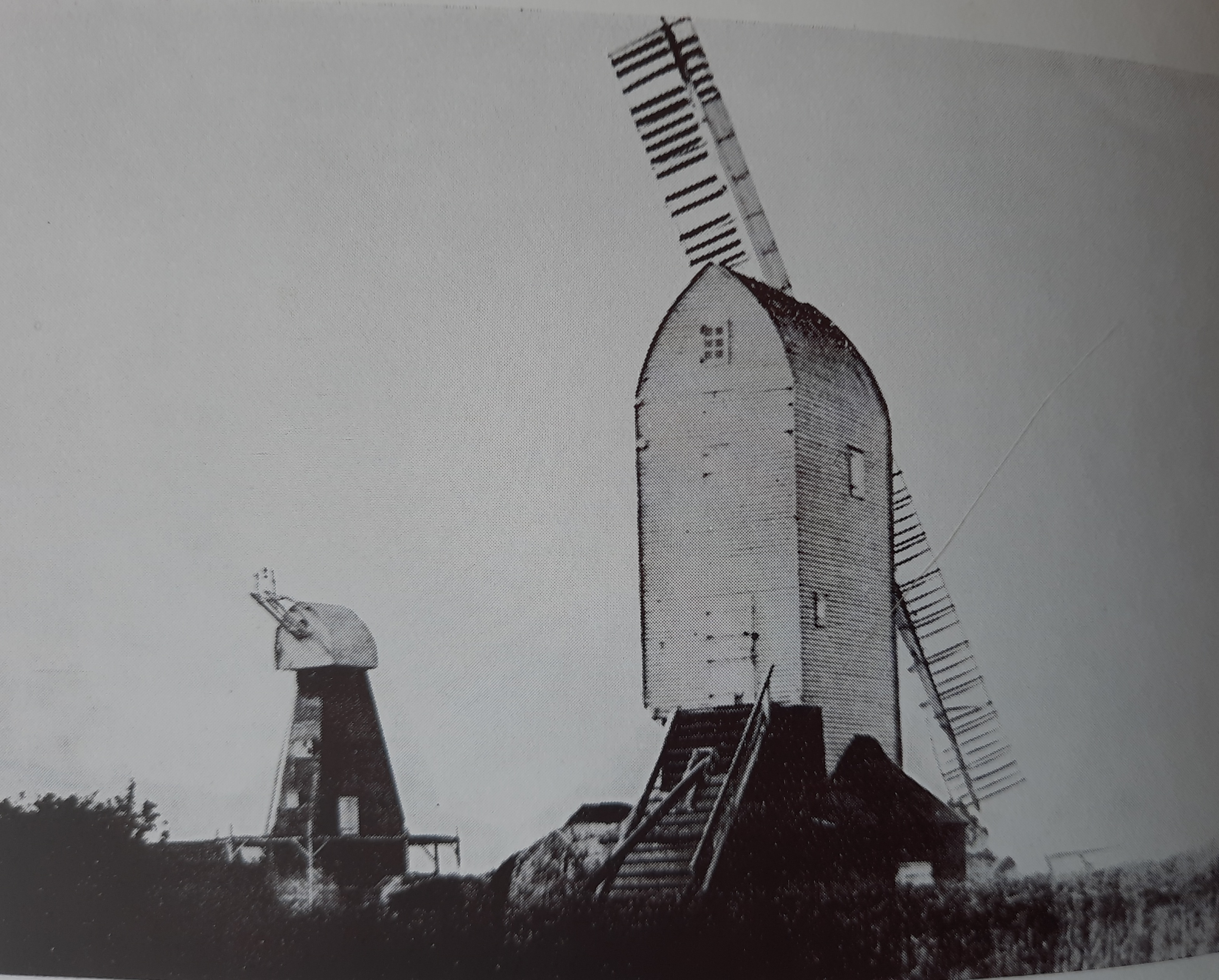
The windmills at Appledore Pre-1900

On the morning of 15th January 1867, a young chimney sweeper, George, died while residing at a barn with Samuel Martin and Caroline Buckman in Appledore. George was described as pale and ill, often beaten by Samuel. While attempting to flee from Samuel, Caroline confessed to the Police. The report resulted in the arrest of Samuel, who said, “I did not kill the boy; he was frozen to death, and I took him from the fire in the lane where I had left him, and took him to the barn, and covered him over there with some straw, and left him.” The body was discovered on the 10th of June, half eaten by rats. Samuel Martin was taken to the Ashford Police Court on the 24th of June and, to the Petty Courts the next day. He was fined and imprisoned for a month before further sentenced to twenty years’ penal servitude. The Lydd Railway Company began construction of rail from Appledore to Lydd in April 1881, and opened on the following December for passengers. The line extended in 1882 to New Romney and a railway line was built north of Appledore Station. During the first Circuit of Europe air race, Monsieur Renaux landed his plane in the outskirts of Appledore in 1911 for fuel. A photo of the time captures the event: the landed plane, a surrounding crowd and the date 3rd July 1911 on the corner.

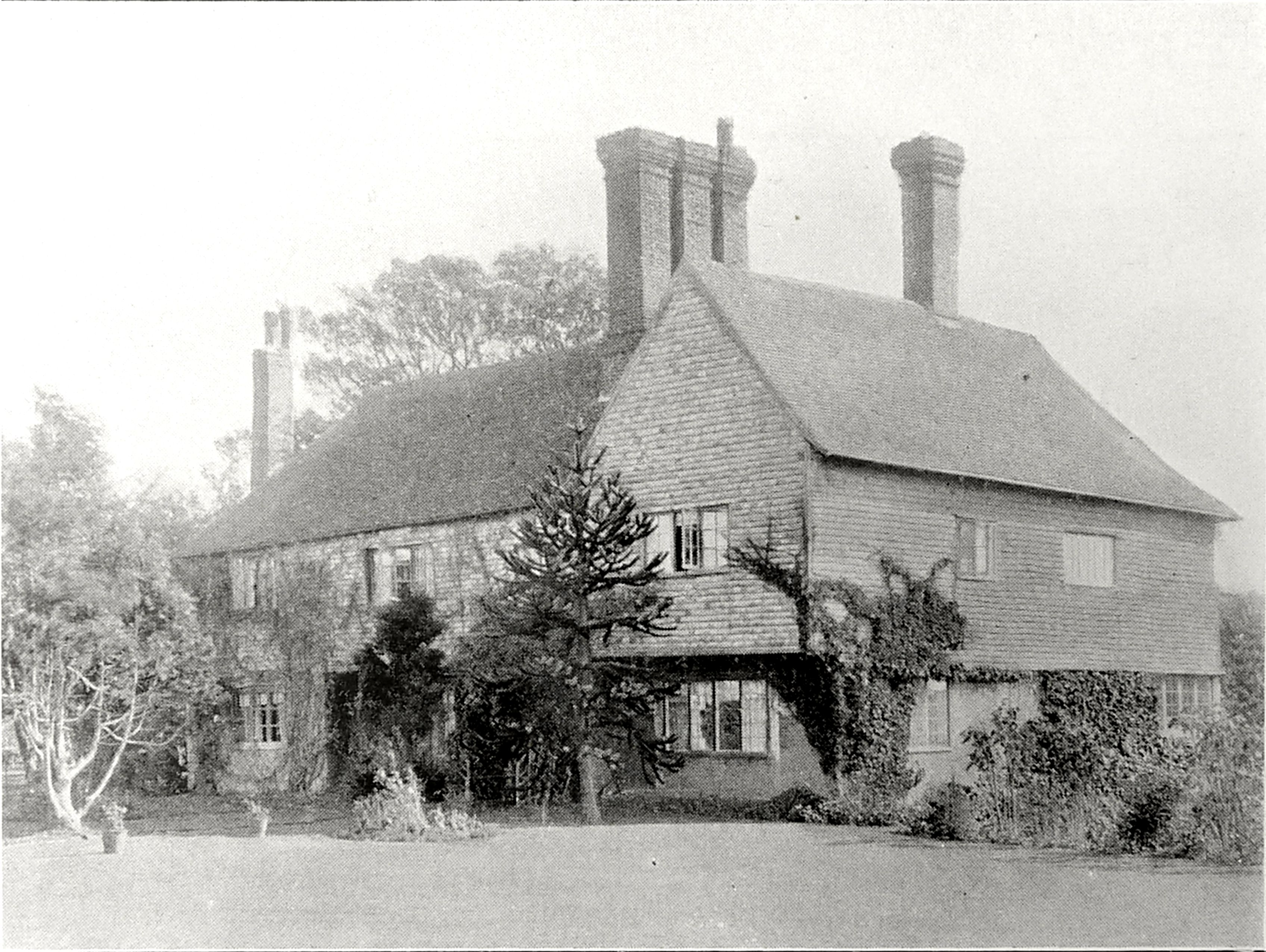
W.T. Pike Contemporary Biographies Kent 1904 Horne's Place at Appledore, Kent

In the honour rolls, previously within Methodist Chapel, there contains the name of 61 men, who served during World War I. 16 of those men named were killed. However, it is believed to only relate to former pupils, with an additional 9 men listed on the rolls of honour in St Peter’s & St Paul’s Church. Puds such as The Swan Hotel were restricted during the wartime. The 4th Battalion of the South Lancashire Regiment inspected the Royal Military Canal between October to November of 1914 and were billeted in local homes. In February 1915, The Kentish Gazette published a honours rolls and includes an additional 19 men. The local post office and shop, Avery and Son, was where the ration books registered during 1918.

A sports pavilion was first constructed in 1925 for a sports field. The pavilion had a thatched roof, and the posts had carved names of young cricket players in kent.

In July 1936, Miss Dorothy Johnston purchases a three-mile stretch between Appledore and Warehorne. She presented it to the National Trust. By September 1938, residents of Appledore were handed out gas masks. Households prepared for the possibility of billeting children to the rural location; 267 children allotted to homes in Appledore. On May 1939, the First Aid Post was relocated from the village hall to a sitting-room due to the halls use by the soldiers. The village hall acted as a lecture hall and cookhouse for the stationed men. The first wave of the evacuations came on the 3rd of September 1939. 75 children and their mothers were relocated from Catford. On the same month, ration books were issued for food and petrol. The Battle of Britain was visible overhead, and Miss Dorothy Johnston would write. ‘There seemed heaps of planes going over. There was constant whirring while I was getting lunch. The soldiers are now made to put on their tin hats whether on duty or not.’

Oast houses near Appledore, 1965

During the midnight of the 18th August 1940, a bomb was dropped on Terry's field, near Appledore. On the 5th September, a Messerschmitt Bf 109 was shot down by Sergeant C.A.L and the plane crashed into Appledore Station. In 1986, the body was be discovered in perfect preservation in the marsh and identified as Lieutenant Helmut Strobl. 15th of the same month, a Hurricane V6688 was shot down during aerial combat.

While in action with the enemy, a Spitfire N3283 shot down 3 days later. By early 1945, blackout curtains was be taken down The spy known as Kenneth de Burgh Codrington moved into Rose Cottage 1961, residing for 25 years with his wife. By the 1950s harsh weather had damaged sports pavilion’s thatched roof and the wooden poles had woodworm, this resulted the construction during 1964 and 1965 of a newer building. The previous medieval style pavilion acted for storage.

== Religion ==
The medieval parish church is dedicated to Saints Peter and Paul. In the 2021 Cencus, around 60.3% of residents identified as Christian.

== Transport ==
The B2080 is a local road connecting Appledore with Tenterden and Brenzett, where it meets the A259 South Coast Trunk Road. The Royal Military Road follows the canal southwest from Appledore to Rye. The Marshlink Line railway line runs between Ashford International and Hastings via Appledore railway station, which is around 1.5 miles (2.4 km) from the village. The line reduces from dual to single track beyond the station towards Rye and Hastings.

== Education ==
Though Appledore previously had Appledore Primary School, the local primary was shut on August 1991 and has remained so since. The nearest primary schools are currently Woodchurch CE Primary School and Brenzett Primary School for students aged 4 to 11. The nearest secondary school and sixth form is Homewood School & Sixth Form Centre.

History of schools in Appledore, Kent

In the will of William Brockhill in 1520, he left an endowment to pay towards a school and provisions for a salary for a priest to teach for perpetuity. The salary was 8 pounds, and had the priest assist the church on Sunday and teach boys grammar on work days. Francis Drayton, Vicar of Appledore, signed a certificate of teaching on the 14th August 1662 for William Graves; a year later, Mr Graves burial records describe him as a schoolmaster. The north chapel of the church was sectioned off for a classroom in 1700. The cost of running the school was subsidised by the parish authorities. However, the annual grant was later discounted in 1820 and forced closure. Curator Rev Goold founded a village school in 1840 and organised multiple charity events for funding. The school was to accommodate 68 pupils, split by gender. By November, a national school was established; 32 boys attended in a hired room, while 36 girls were taught in the church. Plans were drafted for a new building in 1846. The application went to parliament.

Funds went to the purchase the land in 1847. Parliament accepted the plans in October of 1848, and handed a grant of 120 for the construction. The school was built by roughly 1856. The school purchased a quarter acre of land in 1862 for building a playground opposite the main school building. In 1891, a student contracted scarlet fever and was sent home to prevent the spread. From a large donation from the parish council, nearly 300 pounds worth of extensions and improvements was added. During the World War I, the school was used by Troops as a emergency hospital. In 1930, two sports houses were created and known as Caxton and Wolfe. In June 1944, a plane was shot down about 60 yards from the school, causing an explosion that damaged the school building. A swimming pool was built in 1965. 100 pounds worth of fence panels was stolen in 1987. The school later closed on August 1991.

== Parkwood ==
Parkwood is an 80-acre (32 ha) semi-natural deciduous forest 5 miles (8 km) east south east of Tenterden near Appledore. The area is managed by Kent County Council Parks Service.

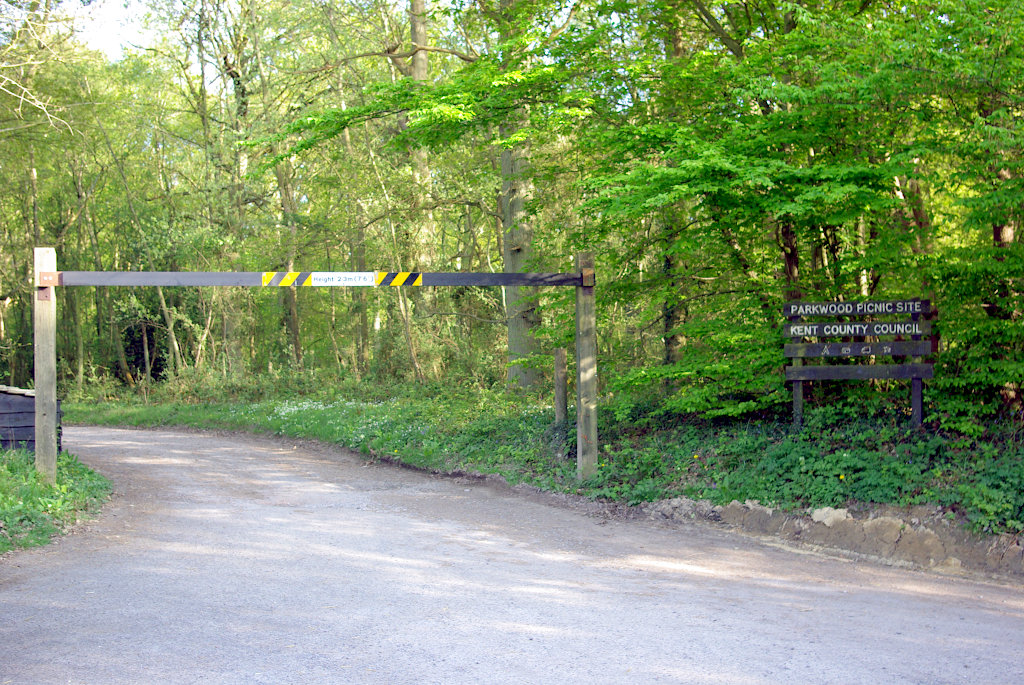
Car park entrance, Parkwood Picnic Site

Heading north from Appledore towards Brattle, there is a car park along Woodchurch Road. Parking is free for visitors. In a survey of countryside sites and parks visited in the last year, around 1% of respondents said they visited Parkwood. This was a total of 3 people.

Park Wood shown within Kent (grid reference TQ964316)

Traditional rotational coppicing is actively used in the management of the woods. This benefits the nesting of nuthatch, woodpeckers and warblers. Oak from coppicing was used for Shorne Woods Country Park's visitor centre as oak thinnings. for the door and window joinery.

Plant species include wood rush and St John’s Wort, and in the late spring bluebells can be spotted. The wood is surrounded by three others: Great Heron Wood (to the north), Little Heron Wood (to the east) and Butness Wood (further to the east). In 2013, around fifty shoes tied to the branches of an oak tree would be discovered by a local councillor.

== In popular culture ==
Appledore was the setting for A. A. Milne's famous verse poem, "The Knight Whose Armour Didn't Squeak". Milne lived 29 miles (47 km) west in Hartfield, Sussex. The fictional village of Plummergen, in the "Miss Seeton" series of crime novels by Heron Carvic, is based on Appledore. Appledore features in the series Darling Buds of May.

== Notable people ==
- Philip Chute, a standard-bearer to Henry VIII, was born and raised in Appledore.
- Caroline B. Winslow, the fifth woman in the United States to graduate in medicine, was born in Appledore.
- William King, a vicar of Appledore from 1568–1576
- John Johnson, a clergyman and theologian, settled in Appledore in 1703
- Christopher Boyd, a Labour MP, retired to Appledore
- Heron Carvic, an actor and writer, would be killed following a accident near his home in Appledore
- Harrison Weir, an English artist, resided in Polar Hall in Appledore.
- Hubert Gordon Thompson, an English surgeon, died in Appledore in 1953

== See also ==
- Listed buildings in Appledore, Kent
