= The Chequers Inn, Smarden =

Pub in Smarden, England

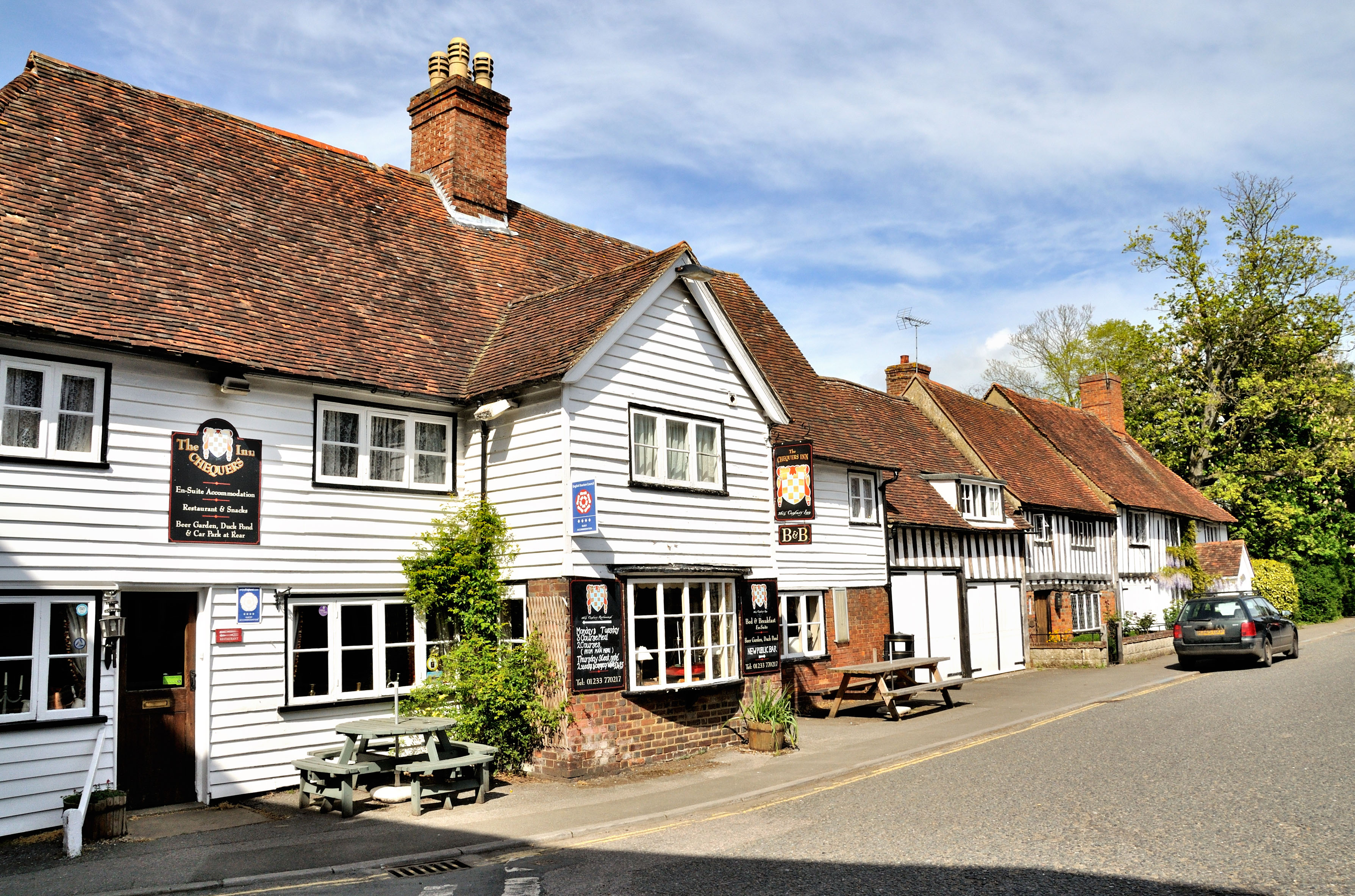
The Chequers in 2014

The Chequers Inn is a public house in the village of Smarden in Kent. It has been listed Grade II on the National Heritage List for England since February 1967. It was built in the 16th-century and is timber framed. It was subsequently refronted in red brick and features extensive weatherboarding.

The 1886 Memories of Smarden' by Rev. Francis Haslewood relates an incident in which a gang of smugglers held a gun to the head of an excise officer who entered the Chequers and demanded their surrender before riding off. The Chequers is one of a number of pubs where the ghost of highwayman Dick Turpin and his horse Black Bess have allegedly been sighted. In 1886 the Court Nil Desperandum society of the Ancient Order of Forresters were registered at the pub and had 90 members.

The sign of the Chequers Inn was traditionally garlanded with leaves and berries from Torminalis glaberrima, a tree popularly known as the Chequers tree, every autumn.

In 2024 permission was granted by Ashford Borough Council to turn the Chequers Inn into a single-family residence.
