= Listed buildings in Appledore, Kent =

Civil Parish in Kent, England

Appledore is a village and civil parish in the Borough of Ashford of Kent, England. It contains one grade I, one grade II* and 37 grade II listed buildings that are recorded in the National Heritage List for England.

This list is based on the information retrieved online from Historic England.

== Key ==
Grade	Criteria
I	Buildings that are of exceptional interest
II*	Particularly important buildings of more than special interest
II	Buildings that are of special interest

== Listing ==
Name	Grade	Location	Type	Completed (Note: The date given is the date used by Historic England as significant for the initial building or that of an important part in the structure's description.)	Date designated	Grid ref. (Note: The grid reference is based on the British national grid reference system, sometimes known as OSGB36, used by the Ordnance Survey.) Geo-coordinates	Notes	Entry number (Note: The "List Entry Number" is a unique number assigned to each listed building and scheduled monument by Historic England.)	Image	Wikidata
Appledore Railway Station	II				2 July 2001	TQ9757829780; 51°02′00″N 0°48′59″E		1245943	Appledore Railway Station More images	Q2414753
Barn at Court Lodge Farm	II				6 September 1985	TQ9550629158; 51°01′43″N 0°47′12″E		1070802	Upload Photo	Q26325242
Goods Shed at Appledore Railway Station	II				2 July 2001	TQ9756329756; 51°02′00″N 0°48′59″E		1245944	Upload Photo	Q26538409
Griffin Farmhouse	II	Appledore Heath			9 August 1979	TQ9524430615; 51°02′30″N 0°47′01″E		1071024	Upload Photo	Q26325767
Merrymead	II	Appledore Heath			9 August 1979	TQ9533630670; 51°02′32″N 0°47′06″E		1071023	Upload Photo	Q26325764
Queens Arms	II	2, Court Lodge Road			9 August 1979	TQ9570729250; 51°01′45″N 0°47′23″E		1071025	Upload Photo	Q26325769
The Well House	II	4, Court Lodge Road			9 August 1979	TQ9569729248; 51°01′45″N 0°47′22″E		1071026	Upload Photo	Q26325772
Horne's Place	II*	Kenardington Road			4 June 1952	TQ9574530870; 51°02′38″N 0°47′28″E		1362879	Horne's Place More images	Q17556931
Manclark Cottage	II	The Heath			9 August 1979	TQ9521731057; 51°02′44″N 0°47′01″E		1071027	Upload Photo	Q26325774
Park Farmhouse	II	The Heath			9 August 1979	TQ9499830381; 51°02′23″N 0°46′48″E		1071028	Upload Photo	Q26325778
Roundabout Friday	II	The Heath			9 August 1979	TQ9529830584; 51°02′29″N 0°47′04″E		1071029	Upload Photo	Q26325783
3 and 5, the Street	II	3 and 5, The Street			9 August 1979	TQ9575229215; 51°01′44″N 0°47′25″E		1071030	Upload Photo	Q26325786
33 and 35, the Street	II	33 and 35, The Street			9 August 1979	TQ9566929384; 51°01′50″N 0°47′21″E		1362881	Upload Photo	Q26644743
Appletree Cottage	II	28, The Street			9 August 1979	TQ9563329379; 51°01′50″N 0°47′19″E		1070996	Upload Photo	Q26325704
Bennetts	II	56, The Street			16 August 1962	TQ9559529515; 51°01′54″N 0°47′17″E		1362904	Upload Photo	Q26644765
Church House	II	11, The Street			9 August 1979	TQ9572629265; 51°01′46″N 0°47′24″E		1362880	Upload Photo	Q26644742
Church of St Peter and St Paul	I	The Street			16 August 1962	TQ9576429282; 51°01′46″N 0°47′25″E		1071031	Church of St Peter and St Paul More images	Q17529260
Chute House	II	24, The Street			16 August 1962	TQ9564229356; 51°01′49″N 0°47′19″E		1300008	Upload Photo	Q26587350
Fayrecross Cottage Old Way Tuckers	II	19, The Street			16 August 1962	TQ9569529319; 51°01′48″N 0°47′22″E		1184657	Upload Photo	Q26479986
Forstall Hall	II	22, The Street			16 August 1962	TQ9564829341; 51°01′48″N 0°47′20″E		1362883	Upload Photo	Q26644745
Hallhouse Farmhouse	II	69, The Street			9 August 1979	TQ9559929672; 51°01′59″N 0°47′18″E		1362882	Upload Photo	Q26644744
Norman House	II	18, The Street			9 August 1979	TQ9565929317; 51°01′48″N 0°47′20″E		1071035	Upload Photo	Q26325803
Poplar Hall	II	63, The Street			16 August 1962	TQ9561029607; 51°01′57″N 0°47′18″E		1071033	Upload Photo	Q26325796
Saxon House	II	34, The Street			9 August 1979	TQ9561929395; 51°01′50″N 0°47′18″E		1362903	Upload Photo	Q26644763
Stables of the Swan Hotel Situated to the North East of the Hotel	II	The Street			9 August 1979	TQ9568729379; 51°01′50″N 0°47′22″E		1300032	Upload Photo	Q26587372
Swan House	II	20, The Street			4 June 1952	TQ9565429325; 51°01′48″N 0°47′20″E		1184692	Upload Photo	Q26480020
The Corn Stores	II	6-12, The Street			16 August 1962	TQ9567029289; 51°01′47″N 0°47′21″E		1184690	Upload Photo	Q26480018
The Homestead	II	The Street			16 August 1962	TQ9550130078; 51°02′12″N 0°47′14″E		1184677	Upload Photo	Q26480006
The Old Watch House	II	The Street			9 August 1979	TQ9574429171; 51°01′43″N 0°47′24″E		1071034	Upload Photo	Q26325800
The Swan Hotel	II	27, The Street			16 August 1962	TQ9567929357; 51°01′49″N 0°47′21″E		1071032	Upload Photo	Q26325791
Tudor Rose Cottage	II	37, The Street			9 August 1979	TQ9565929397; 51°01′50″N 0°47′20″E		1300034	Upload Photo	Q26587373
Vine House	II	9, The Street			16 August 1962	TQ9571829258; 51°01′46″N 0°47′23″E		1300027	Upload Photo	Q26587368
Walnut Tree Farmhouse	II	106, The Street			16 August 1962	TQ9548629969; 51°02′09″N 0°47′13″E		1070998	Upload Photo	Q26325710
Yewtree	II	50, The Street			9 August 1979	TQ9560329470; 51°01′53″N 0°47′18″E		1070997	Upload Photo	Q26325707
Hole Farmhouse	II	Woodchurch Road			9 August 1979	TQ9502531308; 51°02′53″N 0°46′52″E		1071000	Upload Photo	Q26325715
Munk's Farmhouse	II	Woodchurch Road			9 August 1979	TQ9506231308; 51°02′53″N 0°46′53″E		1184730	Upload Photo	Q26480054
Park Hill	II	Woodchurch Road			16 August 1962	TQ9517831369; 51°02′55″N 0°46′59″E		1070999	Upload Photo	Q26325713
Park Hill Cottage	II	Woodchurch Road			9 August 1979	TQ9518831392; 51°02′55″N 0°47′00″E		1362867	Upload Photo	Q26644730
The Old Sweet Shop	II	Woodchurch Road			9 August 1979	TQ9513231155; 51°02′48″N 0°46′57″E		1362866	Upload Photo	Q26644729

== See also ==
- Grade I listed buildings in Kent
- Grade II* listed buildings in Kent

== Sources ==
- Newman, John (2012) [1969], Kent: West and the Weald, The Buildings of England, New Haven and London: Yale University Press, ISBN 978-0-300-18509-6
