= Charles Hampton =

Charles Hampton may refer to:

- Charles Gurney Hampton, fictional character
- Charles Hampton (bishop) in Liberal Catholic Movement
- Charles Hampton, character played by Charles Collette
- Charles Hampton, Governor-General of Order of the Founders and Patriots of America

== See also ==
- Charles Hampton Indigo, fictional character
- Hampton Charles (disambiguation)
