= Listed buildings in Bethersden =

Civil Parish in Kent, England

Bethersden is a village and civil parish in the Borough of Ashford of Kent, England. It contains one grade I, four grade II* and 97 grade II listed buildings that are recorded in the National Heritage List for England.

This list is based on the information retrieved online from Historic England.

== Key ==
Grade	Criteria
I	Buildings that are of exceptional interest
II*	Particularly important buildings of more than special interest
II	Buildings that are of special interest

== Listing ==
Name	Grade	Location	Type	Completed (Note: The date given is the date used by Historic England as significant for the initial building or that of an important part in the structure's description.)	Date designated	Grid ref. (Note: The grid reference is based on the British national grid reference system, sometimes known as OSGB36, used by the Ordnance Survey.) Geo-coordinates	Notes	Entry number (Note: The "List Entry Number" is a unique number assigned to each listed building and scheduled monument by Historic England.)	Image	Wikidata
Bethersden War Memorial	II	TN26 3AG			20 September 2016	TQ9283740253; 51°07′45″N 0°45′16″E		1437859	Upload Photo	Q66477895
Bean Place	II	Ashford Road			10 October 1980	TQ9344639743; 51°07′27″N 0°45′47″E		1070813	Upload Photo	Q26325277
Bridge Farmhouse	II	Ashford Road			10 October 1980	TQ9220139508; 51°07′21″N 0°44′42″E		1070803	Upload Photo	Q26325247
Burnt Oak	II	Ashford Road			10 October 1980	TQ9528939389; 51°07′14″N 0°47′21″E		1070814	Upload Photo	Q26325280
Forge Corner Stores the Laurels	II	Ashford Road			10 October 1980	TQ9291240028; 51°07′37″N 0°45′20″E		1070811	Upload Photo	Q26325271
Forge Dene	II	Ashford Road			10 October 1980	TQ9295239977; 51°07′36″N 0°45′22″E		1362971	Upload Photo	Q26644830
Foster Cottage	II	Ashford Road			24 July 2008	TQ9191539038; 51°07′07″N 0°44′27″E		1392666	Upload Photo	Q26671875
Haffendens	II	Ashford Road			14 February 1967	TQ9294140027; 51°07′37″N 0°45′21″E		1070809	Upload Photo	Q26325265
Island Farmhouse	II	Ashford Road			14 February 1967	TQ9370739626; 51°07′23″N 0°46′00″E		1185147	Upload Photo	Q26480462
Laurel Cottage	II	Ashford Road			10 October 1980	TQ9288940027; 51°07′37″N 0°45′19″E		1299815	Upload Photo	Q26587175
Newtown	II	Ashford Road			10 October 1980	TQ9292940026; 51°07′37″N 0°45′21″E		1070810	Upload Photo	Q26325268
Oast Cottage	II	Ashford Road			10 October 1980	TQ9360339652; 51°07′24″N 0°45′55″E		1362972	Upload Photo	Q26644831
Pig and Sty	II	Ashford Road, TN26 3LF			10 October 1980	TQ9189438761; 51°06′58″N 0°44′25″E		1070805	Upload Photo	Q26325253
Potten Farmhouse	II	Ashford Road			10 October 1980	TQ9193139066; 51°07′07″N 0°44′28″E		1070804	Upload Photo	Q26325250
Renfrew	II	Ashford Road			10 October 1980	TQ9299740026; 51°07′37″N 0°45′24″E		1070812	Upload Photo	Q26325274
Stanley House	II	Ashford Road			10 October 1980	TQ9356539678; 51°07′25″N 0°45′53″E		1185142	Upload Photo	Q26480455
The Bull Inn	II	Ashford Road			10 October 1980	TQ9241239845; 51°07′32″N 0°44′54″E		1070806	The Bull Inn More images	Q26325256
The Stables of the Bull Inn	II	Ashford Road			10 October 1980	TQ9243639830; 51°07′32″N 0°44′55″E		1070807	Upload Photo	Q26325259
Totney	II	Ashford Road			10 October 1980	TQ9340439801; 51°07′29″N 0°45′45″E		1185139	Upload Photo	Q26480452
Weatherboarded Barn to South West of Bridge Farmhouse	II	Ashford Road			10 October 1980	TQ9217639496; 51°07′21″N 0°44′41″E		1362970	Upload Photo	Q26644829
Whiston	II	Ashford Road			14 February 1967	TQ9242539958; 51°07′36″N 0°44′55″E		1070808	Upload Photo	Q26325262
Mill Farmhouse	II	Bateman Corner			10 October 1980	TQ9336340536; 51°07′53″N 0°45′44″E		1299782	Upload Photo	Q26587145
4-8, Batemans Corner	II	4-8, Batemans Corner			10 October 1980	TQ9331640560; 51°07′54″N 0°45′42″E		1070815	Upload Photo	Q26325283
Water Farmhouse	II	Batemans Corner			10 October 1980	TQ9368040381; 51°07′48″N 0°46′00″E		1362973	Upload Photo	Q26644832
Little Hodgeham	II	Bethersden Road, TN26 3HE			10 October 1980	TQ8970040311; 51°07′50″N 0°42′35″E		1299723	Upload Photo	Q26587093
Buck Hall	II	Bull Lane			10 October 1980	TQ9158139747; 51°07′30″N 0°44′11″E		1185162	Upload Photo	Q26480474
Etchden Farmhouse	II	Etchden Road			10 October 1980	TQ9502341803; 51°08′32″N 0°47′12″E		1362974	Upload Photo	Q26644833
Weatherboarded Barn to South West of Etchden Farmhouse	II	Etchden Road			10 October 1980	TQ9497741801; 51°08′32″N 0°47′09″E		1299794	Upload Photo	Q26587156
Oasthouse to South of Thorne Farmhouse	II	Forge Hill			10 October 1980	TQ9313440188; 51°07′42″N 0°45′32″E		1299796	Upload Photo	Q26587158
Thorne Farmhouse	II	Forge Hill			14 February 1967	TQ9315840222; 51°07′43″N 0°45′33″E		1070816	Upload Photo	Q26325287
Weatherboarded Barn to South West of Thorne Farmhouse	II	Forge Hill			10 October 1980	TQ9313640207; 51°07′43″N 0°45′32″E		1070817	Upload Photo	Q26325290
Frid Cottages	II	1 and 2, Frid Coner			10 October 1980	TQ9310641401; 51°08′22″N 0°45′33″E		1185180	Upload Photo	Q26480491
Oasthouse at Frid Farm to North East of Frid Cottages (nos 1 and 2)	II	Frid Corner			10 October 1980	TQ9314241461; 51°08′23″N 0°45′34″E		1362975	Upload Photo	Q26644834
Brissenden	II	High Halden Road			14 February 1967	TQ9419139369; 51°07′14″N 0°46′24″E		1185197	Upload Photo	Q26480510
Chequertree Farmhouse	II	High Halden Road			10 October 1980	TQ9226538387; 51°06′45″N 0°44′43″E		1299768	Upload Photo	Q26587134
Spenceland	II	High Halden Road			10 October 1980	TQ9307538725; 51°06′55″N 0°45′26″E		1362976	Upload Photo	Q26644835
Iddenden Barn	II	Kiln Lane, TN26 3DG			10 October 1980	TQ9370040152; 51°07′40″N 0°46′01″E		1362997	Upload Photo	Q26644853
Kiln Cottage	II	Kiln Lane			10 October 1980	TQ9367240172; 51°07′41″N 0°45′59″E		1070778	Upload Photo	Q26325173
Winifreds Cottage, 2 and 3 Mill Road	II	2 and 3, Mill Road, TN26 3DH, Batemans Corner			10 October 1980	TQ9329440542; 51°07′54″N 0°45′41″E		1299785	Upload Photo	Q26587148
Oasthouse to South West of Lovelace Farmhouse, and 'the Oast House'	II	Norton Lane			10 October 1980	TQ9234240085; 51°07′40″N 0°44′51″E		1070780	Upload Photo	Q26325179
Lovelace Farmhouse	II	Norton Lane			14 February 1967	TQ9243440094; 51°07′40″N 0°44′55″E		1070779	Upload Photo	Q26325176
Great Barton Farmhouse	II	Old Surrenden Manor Road			10 October 1980	TQ9566340346; 51°07′44″N 0°47′42″E		1070783	Upload Photo	Q26325187
Old Surrenden Manor	II	Old Surrenden Manor Road			10 October 1980	TQ9504640095; 51°07′37″N 0°47′10″E		1070784	Upload Photo	Q26325191
Robscot	II	Old Surrenden Manor Road			14 February 1967	TQ9390240415; 51°07′49″N 0°46′12″E		1362998	Upload Photo	Q26644854
Timber Framed Barn to South West of Winter's Farmhouse	II	Old Surrenden Manor Road			10 October 1980	TQ9393440472; 51°07′50″N 0°46′13″E		1362999	Upload Photo	Q26644855
Vitter's Oak	II	Old Surrenden Manor Road			10 October 1980	TQ9499540669; 51°07′56″N 0°47′08″E		1070782	Upload Photo	Q26325184
Weatherboarded Barn to North West of Old Surrenden Manor	II	Old Surrenden Manor Road			10 October 1980	TQ9502140139; 51°07′38″N 0°47′08″E		1070785	Upload Photo	Q26325194
Winter's Farmhouse	II	Old Surrenden Manor Road			14 February 1967	TQ9395440487; 51°07′51″N 0°46′14″E		1070781	Upload Photo	Q26325182
Paris House	II	Paris Corner			14 February 1967	TQ9360740862; 51°08′03″N 0°45′57″E		1185240	Upload Photo	Q26480553
Buss Farmhouse	II	Pluckley Road			10 October 1980	TQ9145441714; 51°08′34″N 0°44′08″E		1070786	Upload Photo	Q26325198
Monkery	II	Pluckley Road			14 February 1967	TQ9141941680; 51°08′33″N 0°44′06″E		1185243	Upload Photo	Q26480557
Pimphurst Farmhouse	II*	Pluckley Road			10 October 1980	TQ9252942129; 51°08′46″N 0°45′04″E		1070788	Upload Photo	Q17556073
Runsell Farmhouse	II	Pluckley Road			10 October 1980	TQ9206241237; 51°08′17″N 0°44′39″E		1299748	Upload Photo	Q26587115
Tippet Farmhouse	II	Pluckley Road			10 October 1980	TQ9162941269; 51°08′19″N 0°44′16″E		1070787	Upload Photo	Q26325201
Willow Cottage	II	Pluckley Road			10 October 1980	TQ9251342045; 51°08′43″N 0°45′03″E		1299757	Upload Photo	Q26587123
Oasthouse at Tearnden Farm to North East of Weatherboarded Barn	II	Smarden Road			10 October 1980	TQ9016140249; 51°07′48″N 0°42′59″E		1070791	Upload Photo	Q26325210
Odiam Farmhouse	II	Smarden Road			10 October 1980	TQ8987240209; 51°07′47″N 0°42′44″E		1363001	Upload Photo	Q26644857
Pierson House Farmhouse	II	Smarden Road			10 October 1980	TQ9050039646; 51°07′28″N 0°43′15″E		1070789	Upload Photo	Q26325204
Quilters Cottage	II	Smarden Road			10 October 1980	TQ9024839599; 51°07′27″N 0°43′02″E		1363000	Upload Photo	Q26644856
Tearnden Farmhouse	II	Smarden Road			10 October 1980	TQ9011640212; 51°07′47″N 0°42′57″E		1185272	Upload Photo	Q26480586
Weatherboarded Barn to East of Pierson House Farmhouse	II	Smarden Road			10 October 1980	TQ9052039647; 51°07′28″N 0°43′16″E		1299720	Upload Photo	Q26587090
Weatherboarded Barn to North East of Odiam Farmhouse	II	Smarden Road			10 October 1980	TQ8989840237; 51°07′48″N 0°42′45″E		1185280	Upload Photo	Q26480593
Weatherboarded Barn to North East of Tearnden Farmhouse	II	Smarden Road			10 October 1980	TQ9014440234; 51°07′47″N 0°42′58″E		1070790	Upload Photo	Q26325207
Dyne's Farmhouse	II	Snoad Hill, Snoadhill			14 February 1967	TQ9414542546; 51°08′57″N 0°46′28″E		1185350	Upload Photo	Q26480665
Snoad Hill Cottage	II	Snoadhill			14 February 1967	TQ9392642154; 51°08′45″N 0°46′16″E		1363002	Upload Photo	Q26644858
Snoad Hill Farmhouse	II	Snoadhill			14 February 1967	TQ9368642009; 51°08′40″N 0°46′03″E		1070792	Upload Photo	Q26325213
Sparrow Hatch	II	Snoadhill			10 October 1980	TQ9381843054; 51°09′14″N 0°46′12″E		1070793	Upload Photo	Q26325217
Weatherboarded Barn to South West of Snoad Hill Farmhouse	II	Snoadhill			10 October 1980	TQ9362541982; 51°08′40″N 0°46′00″E		1299714	Upload Photo	Q26587084
Oasthouse to North East of Ramsden Farmhouse	II	Standard Lane			10 October 1980	TQ9230038499; 51°06′49″N 0°44′46″E		1299681	Upload Photo	Q26587055
Ramsden Farmhouse	II	Standard Lane			10 October 1980	TQ9229238484; 51°06′48″N 0°44′45″E		1299719	Upload Photo	Q26587089
Weatherboarded Barn to North East of Ramsden Farmhouse	II	Standard Lane			10 October 1980	TQ9231238492; 51°06′48″N 0°44′46″E		1362963	Upload Photo	Q26644822
Beacon House	II	The Street			10 October 1980	TQ9308140224; 51°07′43″N 0°45′29″E		1185378	Upload Photo	Q26480695
Bethersden Post Office and Village View	II	The Street, TN26 3AD			10 October 1980	TQ9289940293; 51°07′46″N 0°45′20″E		1070796	Upload Photo	Q26325223
Box Cottage Rose Cottage	II	The Street			14 February 1967	TQ9288240287; 51°07′46″N 0°45′19″E		1185371	Upload Photo	Q26480686
Church Cottage	II	The Street			10 October 1980	TQ9283940262; 51°07′45″N 0°45′17″E		1070795	Upload Photo	Q26325220
Church of St Margaret	I	The Street			14 February 1967	TQ9279240264; 51°07′45″N 0°45′14″E		1070794	Church of St Margaret More images	Q17529237
Court Lodge	II	The Street			10 October 1980	TQ9272540246; 51°07′45″N 0°45′11″E		1185362	Upload Photo	Q26480678
Cudhill Fleur Cottage Prospect Cottages	II	The Street			14 February 1967	TQ9298840261; 51°07′45″N 0°45′24″E		1362966	Upload Photo	Q26644825
Elizabeth House	II	The Street			14 February 1967	TQ9300340250; 51°07′44″N 0°45′25″E		1185385	Upload Photo	Q26480702
Jasmine House	II	The Street			10 October 1980	TQ9301840252; 51°07′44″N 0°45′26″E		1070798	Upload Photo	Q26325230
Johns Cottages	II	1, 2 and 3, The Street			14 February 1967	TQ9296240268; 51°07′45″N 0°45′23″E		1299668	Upload Photo	Q26587043
K6 Telephone Kiosk Outside the Store	II	The Street			4 April 1989	TQ9290940288; 51°07′46″N 0°45′20″E		1071313	Upload Photo	Q26326419
Luton House	II	The Street			14 February 1967	TQ9291640262; 51°07′45″N 0°45′21″E		1070799	Upload Photo	Q26325233
Melville House	II	The Street			14 February 1967	TQ9303640245; 51°07′44″N 0°45′27″E		1070797	Upload Photo	Q26325227
Rose Court	II	The Street			14 February 1967	TQ9294440305; 51°07′46″N 0°45′22″E		1362965	Upload Photo	Q26644824
Street Cottage	II	The Street			14 February 1967	TQ9285940291; 51°07′46″N 0°45′18″E		1362964	Upload Photo	Q26644823
Sunnyside	II	The Street			14 February 1967	TQ9303240308; 51°07′46″N 0°45′27″E		1185374	Upload Photo	Q26480691
The George Public House	II	The Street			10 October 1980	TQ9287340251; 51°07′45″N 0°45′18″E		1185417	The George Public House More images	Q26480731
West View Laburnam	II	The Street			10 October 1980	TQ9285540267; 51°07′45″N 0°45′17″E		1185368	Upload Photo	Q26480684
Tuesnoad Grange	II	Tuesnoad			14 February 1967	TQ9094742027; 51°08′44″N 0°43′43″E		1070758	Upload Photo	Q26325120
Tuesnoad Cottage	II*	Tusenoad			14 February 1967	TQ9086242136; 51°08′48″N 0°43′39″E		1362986	Upload Photo	Q17556953
Barrett House	II	Wissenden			10 October 1980	TQ9057741428; 51°08′25″N 0°43′23″E		1070763	Upload Photo	Q26325136
Bulrush Cottage	II	Wissenden			7 March 2001	TQ9067841407; 51°08′25″N 0°43′28″E		1246642	Upload Photo	Q26539040
Little Odiam	II	Wissenden			14 February 1967	TQ9120641138; 51°08′15″N 0°43′54″E		1070760	Upload Photo	Q26325126
Red Brick Barn to South East of Wissenden House	II	Wissenden			10 October 1980	TQ9063841459; 51°08′26″N 0°43′26″E		1070762	Upload Photo	Q26325133
Ring Cottage	II*	Wissenden			14 February 1967	TQ9127541132; 51°08′15″N 0°43′58″E		1362987	Upload Photo	Q17556960
Star Cottage	II	Wissenden			14 February 1967	TQ9115041178; 51°08′17″N 0°43′52″E		1362988	Upload Photo	Q26644843
Sunnyside Farmhouse	II	Wissenden			10 October 1980	TQ9081041315; 51°08′21″N 0°43′34″E		1070761	Upload Photo	Q26325129
Timber Framed Barn to North of Ring Cottage	II	Wissenden			10 October 1980	TQ9127741151; 51°08′16″N 0°43′58″E		1070759	Upload Photo	Q26325123
Wissenden House	II	Wissenden			14 February 1967	TQ9061141493; 51°08′27″N 0°43′24″E		1362989	Wissenden House More images	Q26644844
Wissenden Grange	II*	Wissenden Lane, TN26 3EL			14 February 1967	TQ9068141448; 51°08′26″N 0°43′28″E		1070764	Wissenden Grange More images	Q17556061
Vine Hall	II	Woodchurch Road			10 October 1980	TQ9405538689; 51°06′53″N 0°46′16″E		1185450	Upload Photo	Q26480766

== See also ==
- Grade I listed buildings in Kent
- Grade II* listed buildings in Kent

== Sources ==
- Newman, John (2012) [1969], Kent: West and the Weald, The Buildings of England, New Haven and London: Yale University Press, ISBN 978-0-300-18509-6
