= Challock =

Village in Kent, England

Coordinates: 51.2208°N 0.8808°E

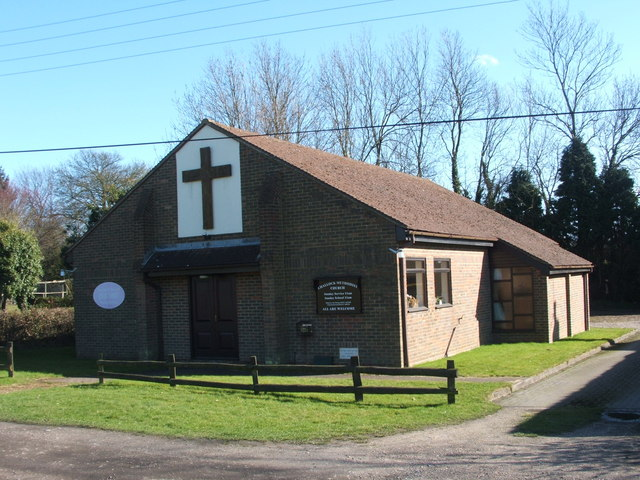
- Challock Methodist Church

- Location within Kent
- Area: 14.07 km^{2} (5.43 sq mi)
- Population: 920 (Civil Parish 2011)
  - Density: 65/km^{2} (170/sq mi)
- OS grid reference: TR011508
- Civil parish: Challock
- District: Ashford
- Shire county: Kent
- Region: South East
- Country: England
- Sovereign state: United Kingdom
- Post town: ASHFORD
- Postcode district: TN25
- Dialling code: 01233
- Police: Kent
- Fire: Kent
- Ambulance: South East Coast
- UK Parliament: Weald of Kent

Challock /ˈtʃɒlək/ is a mostly wooded, large village and civil parish in the Borough of Ashford, Kent, England. The village name derives from the old English 'Cealfloca' – calf enclosure. A clear nucleus of the village is centred 8 miles (13 km) south of the port of Faversham and 5 miles (8.0 km) north of Ashford. It dates from around AD823.

Challock contains a boundary to one of the highest points on the North Downs: the 700-foot (210 m) contour is close to the village centre. Snowfall in January and February is occasionally heavy, when counter-prevailing north-easterly winds exist in those months.

Challock is at the crossroads of two major roads: the A251 from Ashford to Faversham, and the A252, which links Maidstone to Canterbury. Prior to the construction of a roundabout, the crossroads was a notorious accident hotspot for drivers coming from Chilham and Ashford, due in part to the Halfway House public house which stands close to the corner.

William the Conqueror gave the manor of Challock to Battle Abbey, and it remained in the Abbey's possession until the dissolution of the monasteries by Henry VIII in the 16th century. A smock mill stood to the north of the village until 1906 when it was destroyed by a storm – the mill had not been working for many years prior to this event. The parish church is dedicated to Saints Cosmas and Damian; it has fine wall paintings by celebrated local artist John Ward and his friend Gordon Davies. There is also a Methodist chapel in the village. A Goose Fair is held in September each year.

The showjumper William Funnell was born and brought up in the village.

== See also ==
- Listed buildings in Challock
