= Horne's Place Chapel =

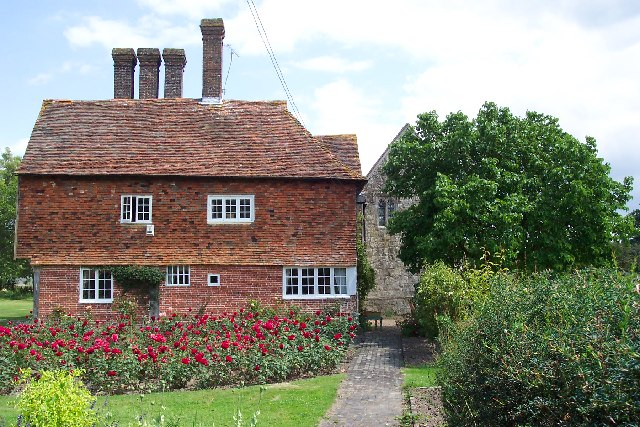
- Hornes Place and Chapel, near Appledore Kent

- Horne's Place Chapel location in Kent
- 51.0437°N 0.791°E
- OS grid reference: TQ 95747 30859

History
- Built: 1276
- Built for: Matthew Horne

Listed Building
- Official name: Horne's Place
- Type: Grade II*
- Designated: 4 June 1952
- Reference no.: 1362879

Horne's Place Chapel is a late mediaeval timber-framed house with private chapel in Appledore, Kent, England.

It was designated by English Heritage as a Grade II* listed building in 1952. The chapel is open to view, but the attached manor house is a private dwelling.

== History ==
In the reign of King John (during 1166 – 1216), 'Ralph de Horne' (of Kenardington), was one of the recognitores magnæ assisæ, or justices of the great assize.

Then in 1276, King Edward granted land containing the manor to Matthew Horne (Ralph's son). A chapel was soon built afterwards. The domestic chapel allowed the Horne family to attend services conveniently at home rather than obliging them to travel to the parish church, and receipt of the licence for worship was an indicator of the family's high status. The chapel was licensed for divine service in 1366 by Archbishop Simon Langham.

Matthew's descendant, William Horne, was one of the conservators of the peace in 1367.

In 1381, the property was entered during the Peasants' Revolt, and £10 worth of goods stolen from the farmhouse.

In 1392, Henry Horne (MP) inherited Horne's Place.

In 1406, Michael Horne (son of Matthew Horne) became a Sheriff of Kent. He is also thought to be buried in a tomb in the chapel.

Later, Robert Horne (Michael's son) also became a Sheriff of Kent in 1452. Soon after the Horne family left Horne's Place and moved to 'Little Horne' in Kenardington. The estate of Horne's Place was known as 'Great Horne'. Robert Horne, then died in 1461.

It was then given by Queen Mary I to Philip Chute (a yeoman of the guard in 1536).

It was then used as a barn in the 19th and early 20th centuries.

== Construction ==
The 8 metres by 4 metres (26 feet by 13 feet) chapel is built of Kentish ragstone and rubble with a tiled roof. Roof was re-placed in 1520. It also has a stone-flagged floor.

It has a double cinquefoil window and blocked 4 centre arch on the west side. The south side has an ogee opening (moulded arch) with a window of 3 cinquefoil-headed lights. The east side has a traceried window with a triple cinquefoil symbol. The northside has a similar window.

The chapel was originally linked to the hall wing of the manor house by a doorway, which is now blocked, along its north wall.

The chapel also has barrel-vaulted undercroft and a roof from 1520 of 4 heavily moulded arch braces rising from stone corbels. The corbels are decorated with Catherine wheels.

Nikolaus Pevsner has described the details of this ‘exquisite little building’ as being ‘of the utmost refinement, far above the level of the local parish churches’ in his Buildings of England.
