= Bethersden =

Village in Kent, England

Coordinates: 51.1290°N 0.7533°E

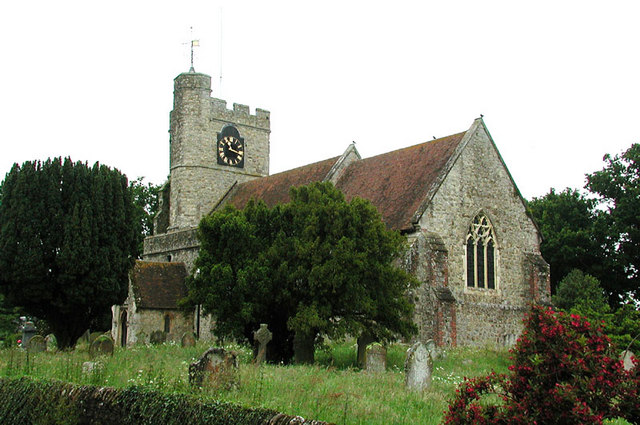
- St Margaret's Church

- Location within Kent
- Area: 26.1 km^{2} (10.1 sq mi)
- Population: 1,481 (Civil Parish 2011)
  - Density: 57/km^{2} (150/sq mi)
- OS grid reference: TQ927402
- District: Ashford
- Shire county: Kent
- Region: South East
- Country: England
- Sovereign state: United Kingdom
- Post town: ASHFORD
- Postcode district: TN26
- Dialling code: 01233
- Police: Kent
- Fire: Kent
- Ambulance: South East Coast
- UK Parliament: Ashford

Bethersden is a village and civil parish in the borough of Ashford in Kent, England, 5 miles (8 km) west of the town of Ashford. Located on the main road, A28, between Tenterden and Ashford.

The village has an active community, including a small primary school, football team, cricket team and tennis club by the park.

Bethersden was formerly the centre of the Kentish wool trade.

Bethersden was the seat of the Lovelace family, at what is now Lovelace Court, which included William Lovelace (MP), and the 17th-century poet Richard Lovelace.

The Bethersden Parish Records Society holds the original parish register, maps, books, photographs and other records relating to the village.

== Bethersden Marble ==
Bethersden has long been associated with the material known as Bethersden Marble which was quarried until the 19th century and used in many of Kent's churches and cathedrals. The name 'marble' is misleading because it is a limestone packed with fossilized gastropod shells which polish well, hence the use of the term.

== Churches ==
- St Margaret's Church, built in the early 15th century.
- Baptist church (Union Chapel).

== Economy ==
Several successful businesses have operated from the village: Stevenson Brothers, who produce high-quality handmade rocking horses; W & D Cole, who make iron gates and railings; and the former Colt Houses, who sold prefabricated timber homes.

The village has three public houses, The Bull, The George and The Pig & Sty. The George had closed in 2020, but was purchased and re-opened in May 2023 by a community group The George Community after they raised over £300,000 with locals buying shares.

== Gallery ==
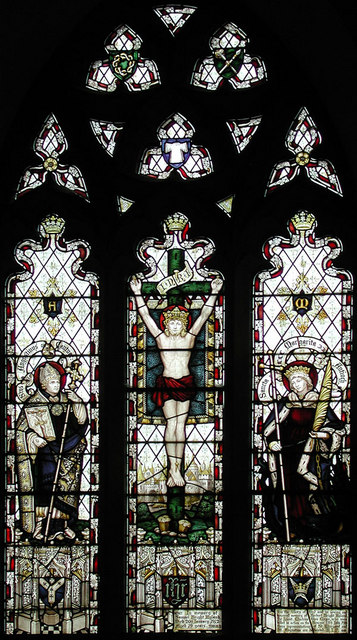
St Margaret - East window

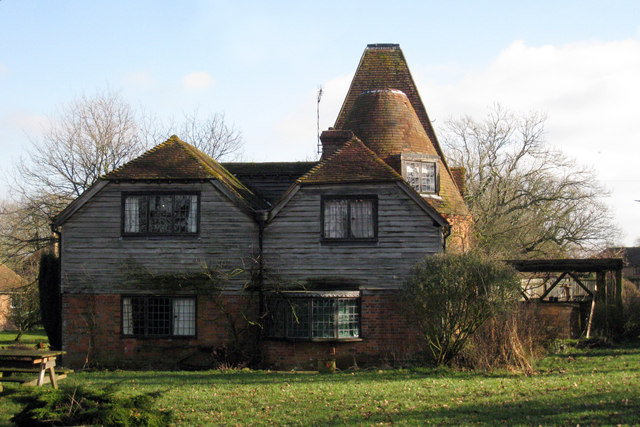
The Oast, Lovelace Farm

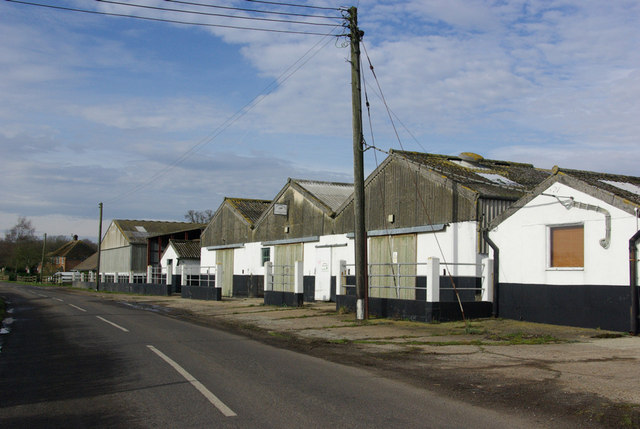
Plurenden Manor Farm

== See also ==
- Listed buildings in Bethersden
