= Leacon Hall =

House in Warehorne, Kent, England

Coordinates: 51.0627°N 0.8338°E

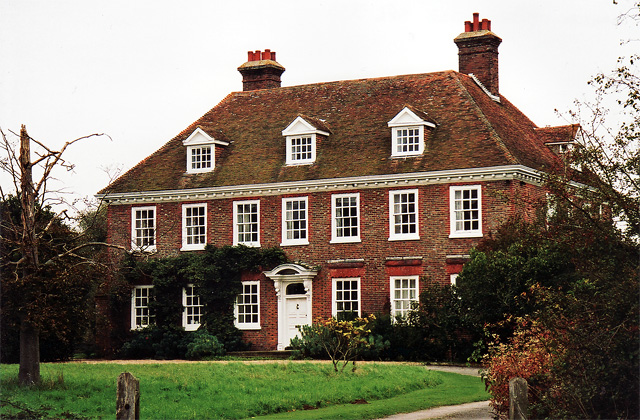
Leacon Hall

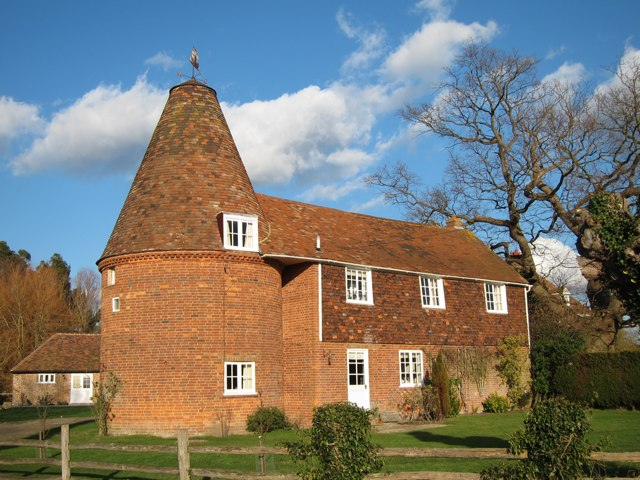
The associated Oast House

Leacon Hall, Warehorne, Kent, England, is a grade II* listed building constructed for Thomas Hodges in 1708.

== Description ==
The house remains on a low hill called The Leacon. Hodges has got two little windows built into the roof. The house has 8,288 square feet of living space consisting of reception hall, four banquet halls, seven further rooms and three restrooms. Pevsner has described the house as ‘a perfect example of a Queen Anne house’, seen from a distance, Leacon Hall at Warehorne in Kent looks every inch ‘a country house in miniature’,
