= Stocks Mill, Wittersham =

Windmill in Wittersham, Kent, England

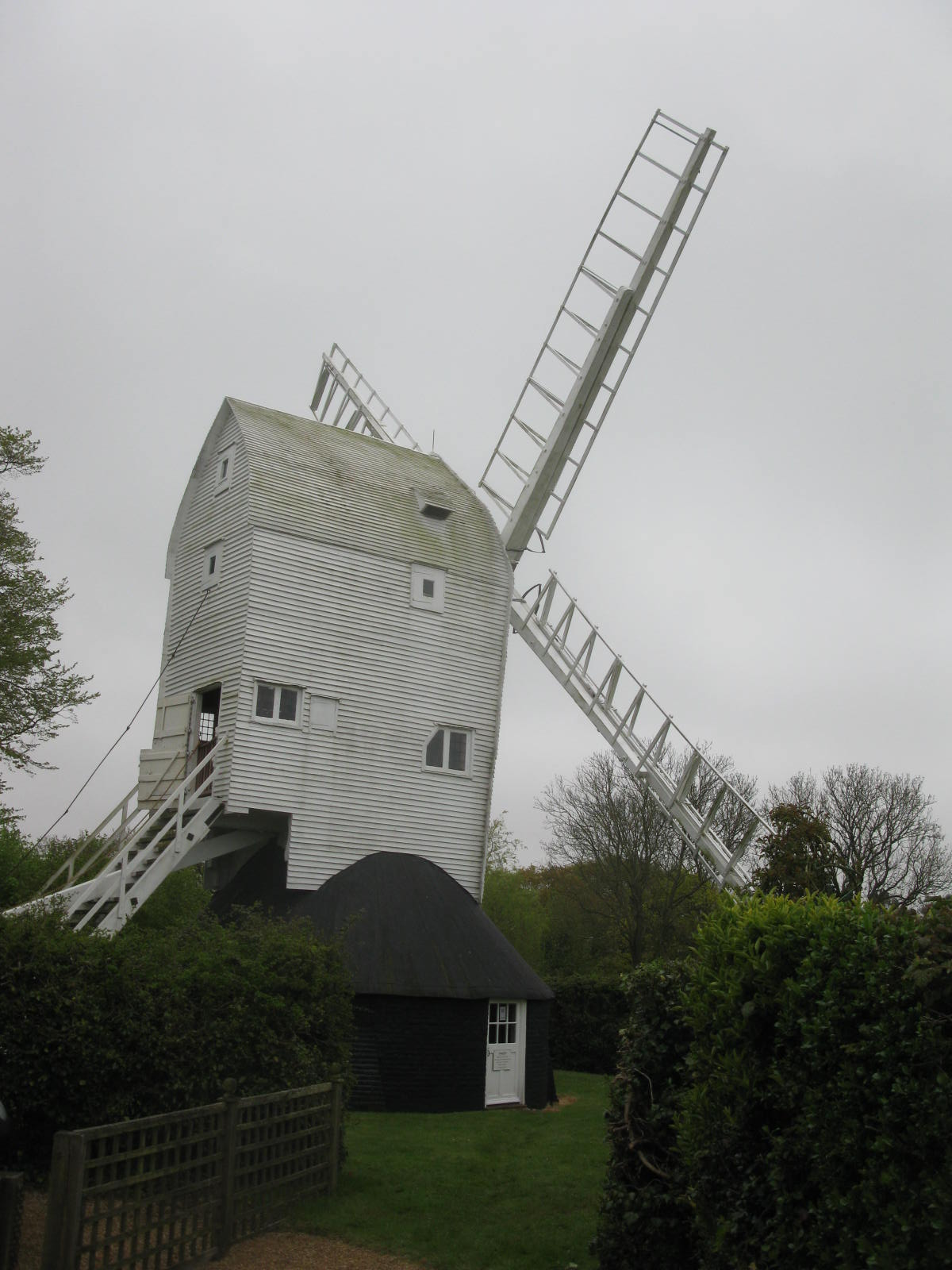
- The mill in May 2016
- Interactive map of Stocks Mill, Wittersham

Origin
- Grid reference: TQ 912 272
- Coordinates: 51°0′48″N 0°43′33″E
- Operator: Kent County Council
- Year built: 1781

Information
- Purpose: Corn milling
- Type: Post mill
- Roundhouse storeys: Single storey
- No. of sails: Four
- Type of sails: Spring sails
- Windshaft: Wood with a cast iron poll end
- Winding: Tailpole
- No. of pairs of millstones: Two pairs, arranged Head and Tail

Stocks Mill is a Grade II* listed post mill in Wittersham on the Isle of Oxney, in Kent, England which has been preserved.

== History ==
Probably built around 1781, it was named Stocks Mill after the village stocks that stood nearby. The mill may be older and may have been moved from Stone in Oxney, with the date 1781 carved into the main post denoting its re-erection. The Mill House was at one time used as the parish Poorhouse. The mill was last worked circa 1900, and was then preserved by Norman Forbes-Robertson, who owned the mill and Mill House. The mill passed into the ownership of the artist Randolph H Sauter. and then Sir Edward Parry. The mill was repaired in 1958, and in 1968 a new stock and pair of sails was fitted by the millwright Derek Ogden. In 1980, the mill was acquired by Kent County Council and the Friends of Stocks Mill was set up to allow the mill to be opened to the public. The mill underwent a restoration programme starting in 2002 and partly funded by the National Lottery, which included two new sails amongst other work. Some of the milling machinery which had been removed over the years was recreated. The mill was reopened to the public in 2004.

== Description ==
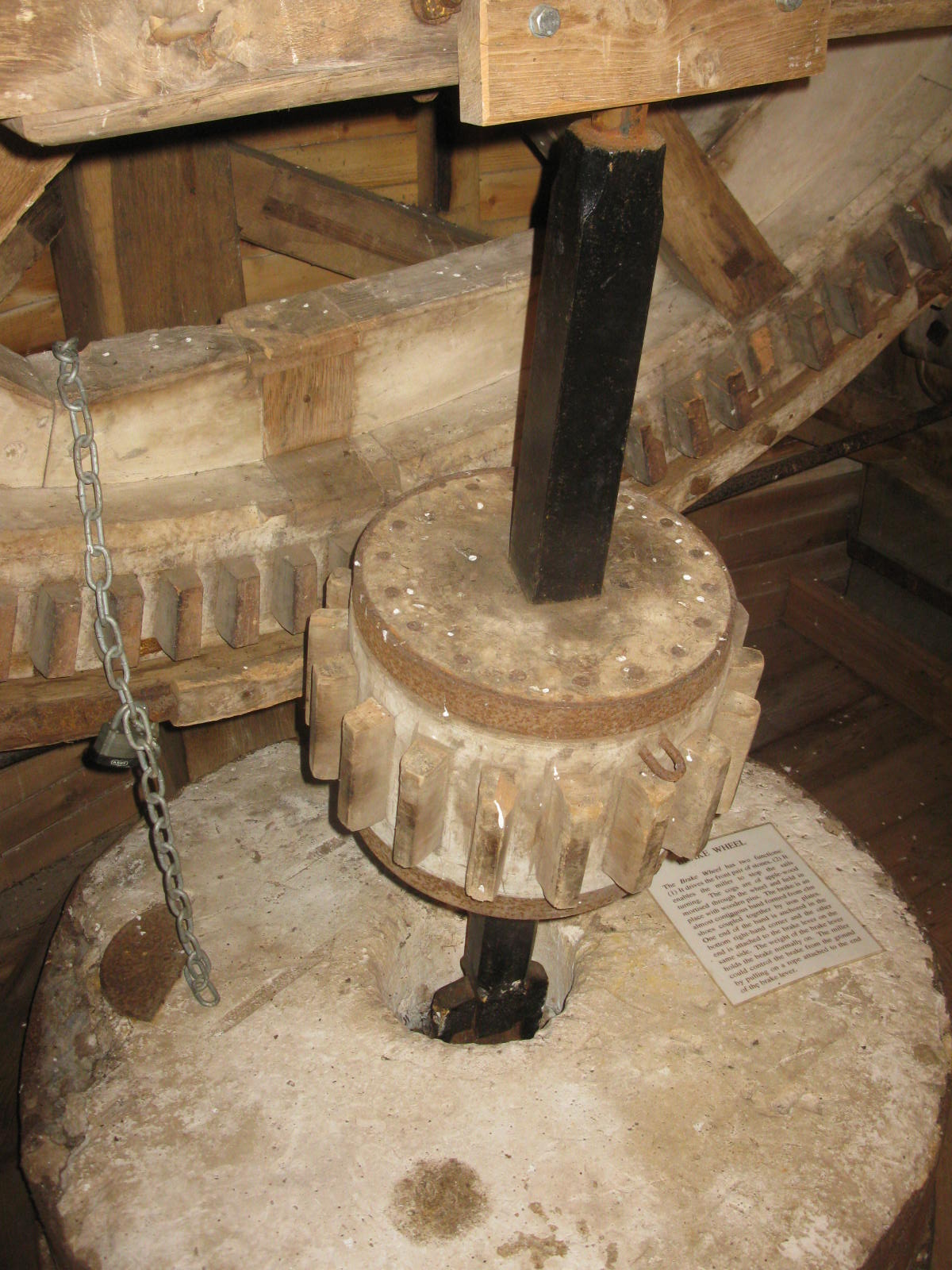
The head stones. Note that the head wheel has been converted from compass arm to clasp arm construction.

Stocks Mill is a post mill on a single storey roundhouse. It has four Spring sails mounted on a wooden windshaft with a cast iron poll end. This carries a 8 feet 9 inches (2.67 m) diameter wooden Head Wheel with 120 cogs, and a 7 feet 9 inches (2.36 m) diameter Tail Wheel. The mill drove two pairs of millstones.

== Millers ==
- Thomas Venus 1772 - 1786
- Henry Munk 1786
- Thomas Howards 1792
- Turner 1825 - 1831
- Richard Parton 1838
- John Grampton 1841
- William Grampton 1841
- William Proctor 1851
- John Spilstead 1851
- Patric Cummins 1851 - 1861
- George Weller 1856
- Robert Parton
- Peter Parton
- G Burch
- H S Hyland
- S Birch
- Thomas W Collard 1870
- John Holdstock 1889 (owner, miller?)
- Pilbeam 1892 (occupier, miller?)

References for above:-
