= Woodchurch, Kent =

Village in Kent, England

Coordinates: 51.0740°N 0.7774°E

Woodchurch
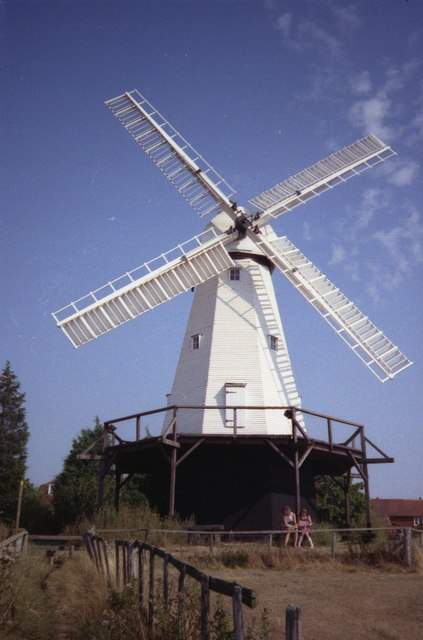
- Woodchurch Windmill

- Location within Kent
- Area: 27.95 km^{2} (10.79 sq mi)
- Population: 1,903 (Civil Parish 2011)
  - Density: 68/km^{2} (180/sq mi)
- OS grid reference: TQ945342
- Civil parish: Woodchurch
- District: Ashford
- Shire county: Kent
- Region: South East
- Country: England
- Sovereign state: United Kingdom
- Post town: ASHFORD
- Postcode district: TN26
- Dialling code: 01233
- Police: Kent
- Fire: Kent
- Ambulance: South East Coast
- UK Parliament: Weald of Kent

There is another Woodchurch in Kent, a hamlet in the Manston civil parish within the Thanet district.

Woodchurch is a Kent village, the largest civil parish in the Borough of Ashford. It is centred 6 miles (9.7 km) from the market town of Ashford and 4 miles (6 km) from the Cinque Ports town of Tenterden, in Kent, South East England. It is situated to the north of the B2067 road from Tenterden to Hamstreet.

The windmill that overlooks the village from the north commands extensive views over the Walland marshes to the English Channel coast. It is a fine example of a Kentish smock mill and was originally one of a pair of windmills standing on this site, known locally as The Twins. The mill is open throughout the summer and is accessible via a footpath that passes between the village pubs.

The village is on the edge of the Weald of Kent, whilst the parish extends 6 miles (10 km) north to south and 4 miles (6 km) east to west, one of Kent's largest. Within the village are the settlements of Brattle and Townland Green. To the south-west is the flat expanse of Shirley Moor leading to Romney Marsh and the low wooded hills overlooking Appledore and the Marsh are to the south-east. The surrounding area is designated as a Kent Special Landscape Area.

== Institutions & village life ==
The village became firmly established in the 13th century with the erection of the large All Saints church made of Kentish ragstone. Although it was extensively restored in the 1840s, it still boasts a 13th-century chancel and a famous brass of the 14th century, depicting a floriated cross design. It has an unusual four-faced clock and a spire which is 18 inches (46 cm) out of the vertical at the top. The church has a peal of 6 bells, with its tenor bell weighing 3/4 ton. Several of the bells were cast at the Whitechapel foundry in London. The bells are rung from an oak framed platform at the tower end. The ringing can be seen from the main church through a large glazed partition. The tower is unusual as it houses four clock faces, an expensive addition at the time of installation, allowing the clock to be seen throughout the village. Much early history of Woodchurch is described by the historian Edward Hasted in his The History and Topographical Survey of the County of Kent.

The village primary school is situated near the church and was a National school. The first building was erected in 1844 and has been enlarged on four occasions, namely, in 1872, 1896, 1990 and most recently in 1998. The main hall was added in the early nineties, under headmaster Alan Green. Temporary "mobile complexes" were added and replaced with permanent structures over the years to accommodate the school's increasing roll.

The village green in the centre of the village is a focal point for the community. It is home to the village football and cricket clubs; which have use of a permanent pavilion on the greenside; as well as a modern children's playground. Alongside the green is the Village Memorial Hall and Annexe, as well as Tennis courts. Plans are currently being considered and funds raised for a replacement Hall. The Hall has a fully functional proscenium theatre space, which is home to the village's Players organisation, who put on three productions every year.

The village also has a community centre on Lower Road. This centre was originally built to replace the original Scout hall on George's Hill which was dilapidated and dangerous. It is now home to Scouts, Guides and other community organisation, as well as being for hire.

Woodchurch also boasts the Woodchurch Village Life Museum located on Susan's Hill and the South of England Rare Breeds Centre is located a mile out of the village on the Hamstreet road (B2067).

The village also has its own Morris dancing side, Woodchurch Morris Men, who started dancing together in 1990 to perpetuate the ancient tradition and have many stands throughout the year.

Historically the village has been home to three public houses. The Bonny Cravat and Six Bells opposite the church in the main village, and The Stonebridge Inn serving the Brattle area at the other end of the village. The Bonny Cravat is a managed Shepherd Neame pub and The Six Bells is a free house. The Stonebridge Inn closed in the early 2000s and has now been demolished to make way for a large newbuild carehome.

== See also ==
- Listed buildings in Woodchurch, Kent
