= Lower Mill, Woodchurch =

Windmill in Woodchurch, Kent, England

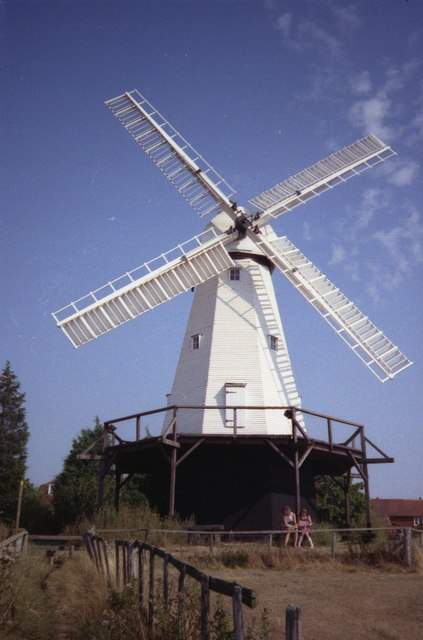
- Lower Mill in 1995

Origin
- Grid reference: TQ 943 353
- Coordinates: 51°5′0″N 0°46′22″E
- Operator(s): Kent County Council
- Year built: 1820

Information
- Purpose: Corn mill
- Type: Smock mill
- Storeys: Three-storey smock
- Base storeys: Single-storey base
- Smock sides: Eight-sided
- No. of sails: Four
- Type of sails: Patent sails
- Windshaft: Cast iron
- Winding: Fantail
- Fantail blades: Eight blades
- No. of pairs of millstones: Three pairs
- Other information: Mill worked with Spring sails during its commercial life. Fitted with Patent sails on restoration.

Lower Mill is a smock mill in Woodchurch, Kent, England that was built in 1820. It was a Scheduled Ancient Monument from 1976 to 1978, and remains a Grade II* listed building.

== History ==
Lower Mill was built in 1820, one of a pair of smock mills, the other being the Upper Mill. It may have had common sails when built as the sale of a pair of sails is recorded in 1848, possibly indicating the fitting of a pair of spring sails. These sails were bought by the owner of the post mill at Brenzett. The mill may have been moved from Susan's Hill Farm, Woodchurch in 1852, although two windmills were marked on the current site on the 1838 Tithe Map of Woodchurch. During its working life, the mill was fitted with second hand millstones from the smock mill at Dymchurch and the post mill at Kennington. The sails on the mill when it stopped working in 1926 had previously been on High Halden post mill and before that Aldington smock mill. A 7 horsepower (5.2 kW) steam engine provided auxiliary power at one time. In 1946, the owner of the mill, Sir Sydney Nicholson, had the mill made weatherproof but plans for further repair and restoration were thwarted by his death the next year. Local villagers raised money for two new sails in 1957, but the cap was found to be unsafe shortly after and the sails had to be removed. By the late 1970s the mill was on the point of collapse, but a restoration programme was put in place and the mill was fully restored, and fitted with patent sails as the windshaft was found to be suitable for these. During its working life, the mill had spring sails. A complete new smock tower was built, and restoration completed in 1986. In May 2010, a new stage was made and fitted to the mill.

== Description ==
Lower Mill is a three-storey smock mill on a single-storey brick base. It has a Kentish-style cap and is winded by a fantail. There is a stage at first-floor level. It has four patent sails carried on a cast-iron windshaft. The Brake wheel drives a wooden Wallower mounted on a wooden Upright Shaft. The Great Spur Wheel also survives. The mill drove three pairs of millstones overdrift.

== Millers ==
- Peter Davis 1820
- John Parton Sr. — 1831
- John Parton Jr. — 1852
- W & J Rayner — 1852–1867
- J Tanton 1867 — 1899
- Albert Tanton — 1899–1926
