= Rolvenden Windmill =

Windmill in Rolvenden, Kent, England

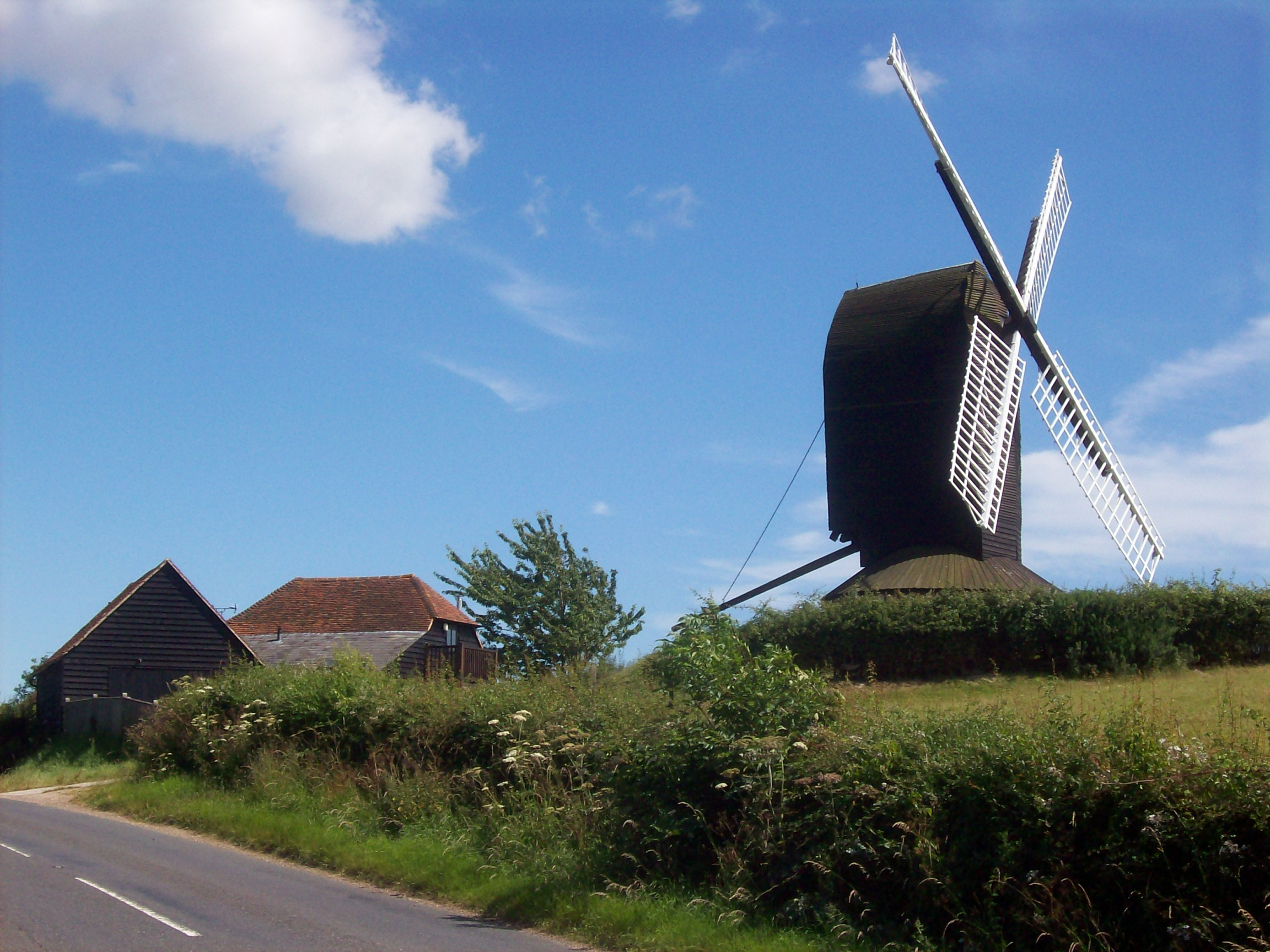
- The preserved mill
- Interactive map of Rolvenden Windmill

Origin
- Mill location: Rolvenden, Kent
- Grid reference: TQ 838 315
- Coordinates: 51°3′13″N 0°37′17″E
- Year built: 1772

Information
- Purpose: Corn milling
- Type: Post mill
- Roundhouse storeys: Single storey
- No. of sails: Four
- Type of sails: Last worked on two Common sails and two Spring sails. Now carries four Common sails
- Windshaft: Wood with cast iron poll end.
- Winding: Tailpole
- No. of pairs of millstones: Two pairs, arranged Head and Tail
- Other information: Mill may be the one that was standing in 1596.

Rolvenden Windmill is a grade II* listed Post mill on the B2086 road west of Rolvenden in southeast England. It is maintained as a memorial to a local resident killed in a road accident in 1955.

== History ==
There is evidence of a windmill in Rolvenden in 1556. The mill is believed to have been built c.1580. A windmill was marked on Symondsos map of 1596, John Speed's map of 1610, Andrews, Drury and Herbert's map of 1769 and the 1819-43 Ordnance Survey map. Rolvenden mill bears a date of 1772, but is believed to be older, possibly the mill marked on the 1596 map. The mill last worked circa 1885, when two sails are known to have been removed. The original roundhouse was demolished during the First World War. The ladder giving access to the body of the mill collapsed in 1917. By the mid-1950s, the mill was becoming increasingly derelict. But in 1956, the mill was restored by Thompson's, the Alford millwrights. The work was paid for by Mr & Mrs Barham in memory of their son John Nicholas Barham (24 July 1937 - 24 August 1955), who had been killed in a road accident. The previously white painted mill was tarred. New common sails were fitted and a new brick roundhouse was erected. The mill was fixed in position, with steel girders supporting the mill from below. The restored windmill is also featured in the title credits of the children's television show Mr Majeika, which ran from 1988 - 1990.

== Description ==
Rolvenden Mill is a post mill on a single storey brick roundhouse. It has four Common sails and is winded by a tailpole. In later years, she is said to have carried "two patent or wood louvred sweeps, which were later removed and used elsewhere. - these would most likely have been Spring Sails, and offers an explanation for the derelict mill with only two sails. When the mill was restored, four Common Sails were erected. The ladder was not replaced when the mill was restored, making access to the mill difficult. The mill has two pairs of millstones, in a head and tail arrangement.

== Millers ==
- Thomas B. Greenhill 1799 - 1828
- E W & H A Allen 1828
- E Witt
- Thomas Record 1834
- Richard Reeves 1839
- George Bridge 1845
- Laurence Foster 1845 - 1852
- R Clemetson 1862
- Collins 1870s
- John Greenhill 1878
- Horace Dunk 1879 - 1883
- James Collins - 1885

References for above:-
