= Smarden =

Village in Kent, England

Coordinates: 51.1761°N 0.7578°E

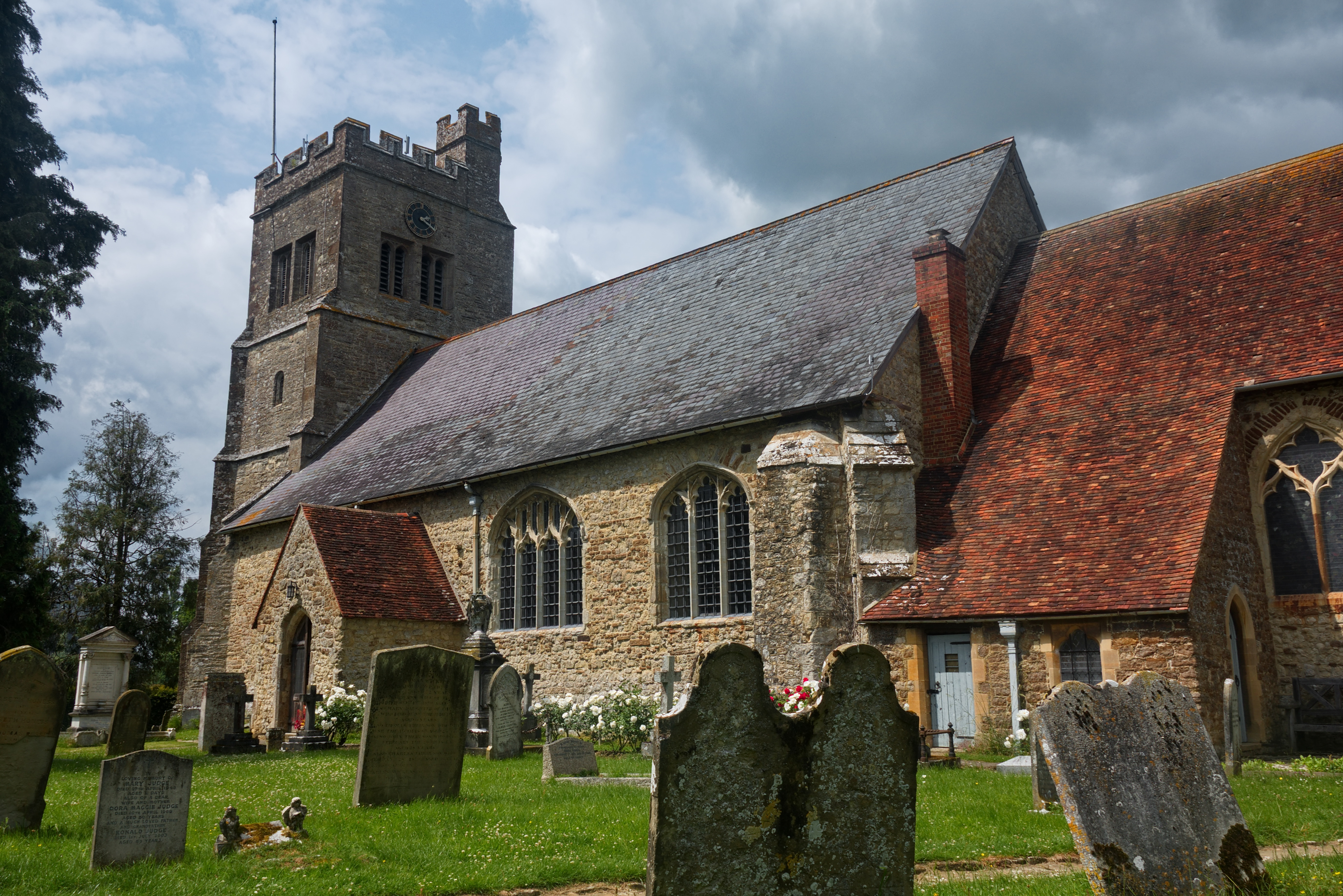
- St Michael the Archangel Church, Smarden

- Location within Kent
- Area: 21.8 km^{2} (8.4 sq mi)
- Population: 1,301 (Civil Parish 2011)
  - Density: 60/km^{2} (160/sq mi)
- OS grid reference: TQ880243
- Civil parish: Smarden
- District: Ashford
- Shire county: Kent
- Region: South East
- Country: England
- Sovereign state: United Kingdom
- Post town: Ashford
- Postcode district: TN27
- Dialling code: 01233
- Police: Kent
- Fire: Kent
- Ambulance: South East Coast
- UK Parliament: Weald of Kent
- Website: Smarden Parish Council

Smarden is a civil parish and village, west of Ashford in Kent, South East England.

The village has the Anglican parish church of St Michael the Archangel which, because of its high scissor beam roof, is sometimes known as "The Barn of Kent".

== History ==
The earliest known date for Smarden is 1205, when Adam de Essex became the Rector of the parish. The area was covered by the forest of Anderida and when clearings were made, the River Beult (a tributary of the River Medway) formed the drainage channel. Smarden undoubtedly benefited from pilgrimages passing through the village to Canterbury after the murder of Thomas Becket in 1170. Which probably explains the many public houses.

There is now evidence for early iron smelting at a number of sites in the parish. The most noteworthy is at Romden where a field known as 'Black Pitts' was commented on in 1912.This area was investigated briefly in 1994 and later in 2008 with the assistance of members of the Smarden history group under the leadership of Neil Aldridge of the Kent Archaeological Society' The features were recorded in more detail and included an area of waste slag from iron smelting together with Roman pottery sherds, ref: KCC Historic Environment Record and Wealden Iron Research Group database. There are other sites which have produced iron working waste, some prehistoric, including one west of Cousins Farm which has been radio carbon dated to the 1st century BC. There have also been a number of finds of pre-historic flint implements including hand axes associated with the river gravels.

The local woollen industry was encouraged by King Edward III who brought weaver craftsmen over from Flanders to create what was to become one of England's biggest industries. Edward in recognition granted the village a royal charter in 1333 permitting them to hold a weekly market and an annual fair thus elevating the status from village to "Town". Elizabeth I, en route from Sissinghurst Castle to Boughton Malherbe in 1576, was so impressed by what she saw and ratified the previously granted Charter. A copy of the Charter hangs in the village church.

== Houses ==
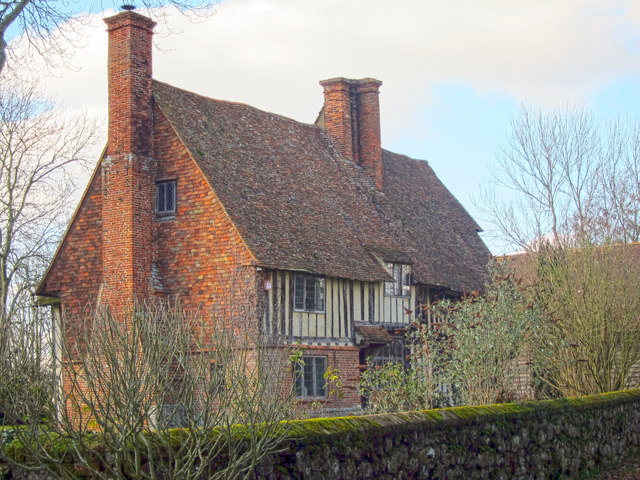
The Cloth Hall, Smarden

Smarden became very prosperous and some fine houses were built in the 15th and 16th centuries, many of which remain today. The Cloth Hall (1430) is an example of a fifteenth-century yeoman's timber hall house. Although built as a farm it became the central clearing warehouse for the local cloth industry; the broad-cloth would have been taken from there to the port of Faversham.

Jubilee House on Pluckley Road is a Grade II listed house built c. 1772.

During the Second World War, houses in Smarden, such as Gilletts, were used to relocate evacuees from London.

== Geography ==
The area is drained by the headwaters of the two major rivers ultimately flowing north, via Maidstone to the west or Ashford to the east. These rivers are the River Medway and the River Stour however many of these headwaters are only seasonal.

== Amenities ==
There are three large, family-catering pubs: The Flying Horse, The Bell and The Chequers. The smaller Maltmans Hill and Haffenden Quarter are also in the civil parish.

== Demography ==
The population rose by 79 between 2001 and 2011.

== Past residents ==
- Dorothy Crisp (1906–1987), author, political writer, publisher, chairman of the British Housewives' League, lived here. She married John Becker in London in 1945, but retained her maiden name; they moved to the village and had two children.
- Lady Marie-Noële Kelly (1901–1995), Society hostess, traveller, features writer. Widow of diplomat Sir David Kelly. Lived at Romden until her death in 1995.
- John Baptist Lucius Noel (1890–1989), British army officer, adventurer, mountaineer (official photographer of the 1922 and 1924 Everest expeditions) lived in and restored the Cloth Hall and at Hartnup House.
- Mervyn Peake, author and artist. Lived in Smarden in 1950.
- George Roger (1908–1995), pioneer photojournalist. Known for his Second world war photography. First Western photographer at the relief of Bergen Belsen. His post war African tribal photography created a new genre of photography, including the Nuba tribes of Sudan. A founding member of the Magnum photo agency. Lived at Waterside house.
- Michael Randolph (1925–1997), editor of The Reader's Digest and member of the Press Council lived at The Cloth Hall from 1962 to 1989. On his retirement he became an assistant Priest of the Parish after attending the Canterbury school of ministry.
