= Roy Peter Martin =

English author

Roy Peter Martin (5 January 1931 – 23 March 2014) was an English author who wrote primarily under the pseudonyms James Melville and Hampton Charles.

Martin was born in London and studied philosophy at Birkbeck College. He served in the Royal Air Force before a career first in the Royal Festival Hall and then as a diplomat in the British Council based in Japan.

As James Melville he wrote a series of 13 detective novels set in Japan featuring Tetsuo Otani, the fictional Superintendent of Police in Kobe, and several historical novels, including The Imperial Way, which was inspired by the February 26 Incident. He also wrote three Miss Seeton novels under the pseudonym Hampton Charles, as well as a cook book, Japanese Cooking together with Joan Martin, his second wife.

He wrote a history of the Japanese imperial family, The Chrysanthemum Throne, which was published in the United Kingdom in 1997 by Sutton Publishing Limited and later in the United States by the University of Hawai'i Press.

== Works ==
=== Novels under the pseudonym James Melville ===
- The Superintendent Otani Mysteries:
1. Wages of Zen (1979)
2. The Chrysanthemum Chain (1980)
3. A Sort of Samurai (1981)
4. The Ninth Netsuke (1982)
5. Sayonara, Sweet Amaryllis (1983)
6. Death of a Daimyo (1984)
7. The Death Ceremony (1985)
8. Go Gently, Gaijin (1986)
9. Kimono for a Corpse (1988)
10. The Reluctant Ronin (1988)
11. A Haiku for Hanae (1989)
12. The Bogus Buddha (1990)
13. The Body Wore Brocade (1992)

=== Novels under the pseudonym Hampton Charles ===
- The Miss Seeton Mysteries:
1. Miss Seeton, by Appointment (1990)
2. Advantage Miss Seeton (1990)
3. Miss Seeton at the Helm (1990)

== Bibliography ==
- Binyon, T. J. (1989). Murder will out. Oxford: Oxford University Press. pp. 100. ISBN 978-0-19-219223-3.
- Macdonald, Gina (2003). British mystery and thriller writers since 1960. Dictionary of literary biography, 276. Gale Group. p. 253. ISBN 978-0-7876-6020-8.
- Mesplède, Claude (2007). Dictionnaire des littératures policières. Temps noir (in French). Vol. 2. J - Z. Nantes: Joseph K. pp. 346–347. ISBN 978-2-910-68645-1. OCLC 315873361.
- Nichols, Victoria; Thompson, Susan (1998). Silk stalkings: more women write of murder. Scarecrow Press. pp. 277. ISBN 978-0-8108-3393-7.
