= Miss Seeton =

Heroine of British cozy mystery novels

Emily D(orothea) Seeton, also known as Miss Seeton or MissEss, is the fictional heroine of a series of British cosy mystery novels by Heron Carvic, Roy Peter Martin writing as Hampton Charles, and Sarah J. Mason writing as Hamilton Crane. Cosy Mysteries lists the books as the "Retired British Art Teacher in England Series".

Miss Seeton inadvertently draws psychologically and, perhaps, psychically informative sketches that allow Superintendent (later re-graded to Chief Superintendent, following the real-life restructuring of British police forces) Delphick, known as the Oracle, and his Sergeant, Bob Ranger, to solve the crime. The primary plot element is Miss Seeton finding herself in an awkward situation as a result of logical and ladylike actions.

Plummergen is the archetypal English village, with an array of character types from retired Major General Sir George Colvedon, Bart., K.C.B., D.S.O., J.P to others.

== Bibliography ==
Heron Carvic

- Picture Miss Seeton (1968). The 1968 US (Harper & Row) edition of Picture Miss Seeton contains characters and scenes not included in the 1968 UK (Geoffrey Bles) edition. Subsequent reissues have used the Geoffrey Bles text.
- Miss Seeton Draws the Line (1969)
- Witch Miss Seeton (1971) (UK title Miss Seeton, Bewitched)
- Miss Seeton Sings (1973)
- Odds on Miss Seeton (1975)

Roy Peter Martin writing as Hampton Charles

- Miss Seeton, by Appointment (1990)
- Advantage Miss Seeton (1990)
- Miss Seeton at the Helm (1990)

Sarah J. Mason writing as Hamilton Crane

- Miss Seeton Cracks the Case (1991)
- Miss Seeton Paints the Town (1991)
- Miss Seeton Rocks the Cradle (1992)
- Hands Up, Miss Seeton (1992)
- Miss Seeton by Moonlight (1992)
- Miss Seeton Plants Suspicion (1993)
- Miss Seeton Goes to Bat (1993)
- Starring Miss Seeton (1994)
- Miss Seeton Undercover (1994)
- Miss Seeton Rules (1994)
- Sold to Miss Seeton (1995)
- Sweet Miss Seeton (1996)
- Bonjour, Miss Seeton (1997)
- Miss Seeton's Finest Hour (1999)
- Miss Seeton Quilts the Village (2017)
- Miss Seeton Flies High (2018)
