= Listed buildings in the borough of Ashford, Kent =

There are about 2,400 Listed Buildings in the borough of Ashford, which are buildings of architectural historic interest.

- Grade I buildings are of exceptional interest.
- Grade II* buildings are particularly important buildings of more than special interest.
- Grade II buildings are of special interest.

The lists follow Historic England’s geographical organisation, with entries grouped by county, local authority, and parish (civil and non-civil). The following lists are arranged by parish.

Parish	Listed buildings list	Grade I	Grade II*	Grade II	Total
Aldington	Listed buildings in Aldington, Kent	1	3	48	52
Appledore	Listed buildings in Appledore, Kent	1	1	37	39
Ashford non civil parish	Listed buildings in Ashford, Kent	1	11	156	168
Bethersden	Listed buildings in Bethersden	1	4	97	102
Biddenden	Listed buildings in Biddenden	3	8	104	115
Bilsington	Listed buildings in Bilsington				
Bonnington	Listed buildings in Bonnington				
Boughton Aluph	Listed buildings in Boughton Aluph	1	1	35	37
Brabourne	Listed buildings in Brabourne				
Brook	Listed buildings in Brook, Kent	1	4	17	22
Challock	Listed buildings in Challock				
Charing	Listed buildings in Charing	6	12	99	117
Chilham	Listed buildings in Chilham				
Crundale	Listed buildings in Crundale, Kent				
Eastwell	Listed buildings in Eastwell, Kent				
Egerton	Listed buildings in Egerton, Kent				
Godmersham	Listed buildings in Godmersham				
Great Chart with Singleton	Listed buildings in Great Chart with Singleton				
Hastingleigh	Listed buildings in Hastingleigh				
High Halden	Listed buildings in High Halden	1	1	45	47
Hothfield	Listed buildings in Hothfield				
Kenardington	Listed buildings in Kenardington				
Kennington	Listed buildings in Kennington, Kent			46	46
Kingsnorth	Listed buildings in Kingsnorth				
Little Chart	Listed buildings in Little Chart				
Mersham	Listed buildings in Mersham				
Molash	Listed buildings in Molash				
Newenden	Listed buildings in Newenden				
Orlestone	Listed buildings in Orlestone				
Pluckley	Listed buildings in Pluckley	1	4	68	73
Rolvenden	Listed buildings in Rolvenden				
Ruckinge	Listed buildings in Ruckinge				
Sevington with Finberry	Listed buildings in Sevington				
Shadoxhurst	Listed buildings in Shadoxhurst				
Smarden	Listed buildings in Smarden	1	8	121	130
Smeeth	Listed buildings in Smeeth				
South Willesborough and Newtown	Listed buildings in South Willesborough and Newtown			8	8
Stanhope	no listed buildings				
Stone-cum-Ebony	Listed buildings in Stone-cum-Ebony				
Tenterden	Listed buildings in Tenterden	1	18	197	216
Warehorne	Listed buildings in Warehorne				
Westwell	Listed buildings in Westwell, Kent				
Wittersham	Listed buildings in Wittersham				
Woodchurch	Listed buildings in Woodchurch, Kent				
Wye with Hinxhill	Listed buildings in Wye with Hinxhill	4	7	129	140
