= Listed buildings in Ashford, Kent =

Civil Parish in Kent, England

Ashford is an unparished town in the Borough of Ashford of Kent, England. It contains one grade I, eleven grade II* and 156 grade II listed buildings that are recorded in the National Heritage List for England.

This list is based on the information retrieved online from Historic England.

== Key ==
Grade	Criteria
I	Buildings that are of exceptional interest
II*	Particularly important buildings of more than special interest
II	Buildings that are of special interest

== Listing ==
Name	Grade	Location	Type	Completed (Note: The date given is the date used by Historic England as significant for the initial building or that of an important part in the structure's description.)	Date designated	Grid ref. (Note: The grid reference is based on the British national grid reference system, sometimes known as OSGB36, used by the Ordnance Survey.) Geo-coordinates	Notes	Entry number (Note: The "List Entry Number" is a unique number assigned to each listed building and scheduled monument by Historic England.)	Image	Wikidata
Barn to South West of Repton Manor	II				21 October 1999	TQ9986043473; 51°09′20″N 0°51′24″E		1378992	Upload Photo	Q26659298
Repton Manor (templar Barracks)	II				21 October 1999	TQ9983443525; 51°09′22″N 0°51′23″E		1378986	Upload Photo	Q26659292
1-19, Barrowhill Cottages	II	1-19, Barrowhill Cottages			4 June 1976	TR0052242969; 51°09′03″N 0°51′57″E		1362819	Upload Photo	Q26644685
1-5, Barrowhill Place	II	1-5, Barrowhill Place			4 June 1976	TR0054443047; 51°09′06″N 0°51′58″E		1071140	Upload Photo	Q26326078
6-8, Barrowhill Place	II	6-8, Barrowhill Place			31 March 2000	TR0052543061; 51°09′06″N 0°51′57″E		1071141	Upload Photo	Q26326081
1-15, Barrowhill Terrace	II	1-15, Barrowhill Terrace			4 June 1976	TR0050943036; 51°09′05″N 0°51′56″E		1300251	Upload Photo	Q26587568
Manor House	II	Bentley Road, Willesborough, TN24 0HP			18 July 1994	TR0232641412; 51°08′10″N 0°53′26″E		1275211	Upload Photo	Q26564816
14-18, Blackwall Road	II	14-18, Blackwall Road			4 June 1976	TR0328142806; 51°08′54″N 0°54′18″E		1184225	Upload Photo	Q26479547
2-8, Blackwall Road	II	2-8, Blackwall Road			4 June 1976	TR0323342800; 51°08′54″N 0°54′16″E		1071142	Upload Photo	Q26326084
20, Blackwall Road	II	20, Blackwall Road			4 June 1976	TR0349642809; 51°08′54″N 0°54′29″E		1362836	Upload Photo	Q26644699
Boys Hall	II	Boys Hall Road, Willesborough			24 September 1951	TR0281341200; 51°08′03″N 0°53′51″E		1071101	Upload Photo	Q26325999
Little Boys Hall	II	Boys Hall Road, Willesborough			24 September 1951	TR0290341327; 51°08′07″N 0°53′56″E		1362837	Upload Photo	Q26644700
Parks and Cemeteries Office	II	Canterbury Road			4 June 1976	TR0108943280; 51°09′12″N 0°52′27″E		1362838	Upload Photo	Q26644701
Wall and Gatepiers to Cemetery	II	Canterbury Road			4 June 1976	TR0107743263; 51°09′12″N 0°52′26″E		1071102	Upload Photo	Q26326001
3, Castle Street	II	3, Castle Street			4 June 1976	TR0084942869; 51°08′59″N 0°52′13″E		1362842	3, Castle Street More images	Q26644705
Former Castle Hotel	II	1, Castle Street, TN23 1JQ			4 June 1976	TR0084742865; 51°08′59″N 0°52′13″E		1300196	Former Castle Hotel More images	Q26587521
East Lodge to Godinton Park	II	Chart Road			4 June 1976	TQ9982743084; 51°09′08″N 0°51′21″E		1071108	Upload Photo	Q26326016
Former National School Including Iron Railings	II	Chart Road, TN23 3TN			4 June 1976	TR0051243088; 51°09′07″N 0°51′57″E		1362861	Upload Photo	Q26644724
Christ Church	II	Christchurch Road, South Ashford			4 June 1976	TR0085541739; 51°08′23″N 0°52′11″E		1071109	Christ Church More images	Q5108664
88, Church Road	II	88, Church Road, Willesborough			4 June 1976	TR0300241821; 51°08′23″N 0°54′02″E		1071112	Upload Photo	Q26326023
94, Church Road	II	94, Church Road, Willesborough			4 June 1976	TR0303141843; 51°08′23″N 0°54′03″E		1184289	Upload Photo	Q26479614
96, Church Road	II	96, Church Road, Willesborough			4 June 1976	TR0302041853; 51°08′24″N 0°54′03″E		1071113	Upload Photo	Q26326024
Ashford War Memorial and Ornamental Gates to Garden of Remembrance	II	Church Road			7 February 2007	TR0106042555; 51°08′49″N 0°52′24″E		1391853	Ashford War Memorial and Ornamental Gates to Garden of Remembrance More images	Q26671195
Old National School St Marys Hall	II	48, Church Road, Willesborough			14 February 1986	TR0296941714; 51°08′19″N 0°54′00″E		1071022	Upload Photo	Q26325762
The Rectory	II	Church Road, Willesborough			26 October 1973	TR0309241849; 51°08′24″N 0°54′07″E		1300205	Upload Photo	Q26587530
3, Churchyard Passage	II	3, Churchyard Passage			4 June 1976	TR0096442712; 51°08′54″N 0°52′19″E		1071119	Upload Photo	Q26326033
11, East Hill	II	11, East Hill			24 September 1951	TR0137442817; 51°08′57″N 0°52′40″E		1300169	Upload Photo	Q26587495
5, East Hill, 7, East Hill	II	5, East Hill, 7, East Hill			24 September 1951	TR0124442791; 51°08′56″N 0°52′34″E		1300162	5, East Hill, 7, East Hill More images	Q26587488
Bridge House	II*	22, East Hill			24 September 1951	TR0144042774; 51°08′56″N 0°52′44″E		1071079	Bridge House More images	Q17556115
Brooke Place	II	9, East Hill			24 September 1951	TR0126742796; 51°08′56″N 0°52′35″E		1362807	Brooke Place More images	Q26644673
Garden Wall to West of No 22	II	East Hill			4 June 1976	TR0142642786; 51°08′56″N 0°52′43″E		1071080	Upload Photo	Q26325952
Nightingale House	II*	14, East Hill			24 September 1951	TR0127342767; 51°08′56″N 0°52′35″E		1071078	Nightingale House More images	Q17556109
Northside	II	24, East Hill			24 September 1951	TR0145842779; 51°08′56″N 0°52′45″E		1362865	Upload Photo	Q26644728
Railings and Wall to East of No 14	II	East Hill			4 June 1976	TR0128842778; 51°08′56″N 0°52′36″E		1362864	Railings and Wall to East of No 14 More images	Q26644727
The Star Inn	II	28, East Hill			24 September 1951	TR0147242770; 51°08′55″N 0°52′45″E		1071081	The Star Inn More images	Q26325955
Wall to South East No 9	II	East Hill			4 June 1976	TR0129042786; 51°08′56″N 0°52′36″E		1071120	Upload Photo	Q26326038
Wall to South East of No 11	II	East Hill			4 June 1976	TR0136842790; 51°08′56″N 0°52′40″E		1362808	Upload Photo	Q26644674
Loudon Cottages	II	1 and 2, Godinton Park			24 September 1951	TQ9877143493; 51°09′22″N 0°50′28″E		1071082	Upload Photo	Q26325957
North Lodge to Godinton Park	II	Godinton Road			4 June 1976	TQ9874044197; 51°09′45″N 0°50′28″E		1362828	North Lodge to Godinton Park More images	Q26644692
Wall and Gate Piers to Godinton Park to North West of North Lodge	II	Godinton Road			4 June 1976	TQ9873644202; 51°09′45″N 0°50′27″E		1071083	Upload Photo	Q26325960
Beaver House	II	2, Hampdew Lane, South Ashford			4 June 1976	TR0045141033; 51°08′01″N 0°51′49″E		1362829	Upload Photo	Q26644693
County Hotel	II	10, High Street			24 September 1951	TR0119442822; 51°08′57″N 0°52′31″E		1071091	County Hotel More images	Q26325980
12-18, High Street	II	12-18, High Street			18 December 1973	TR0117842811; 51°08′57″N 0°52′30″E		1184514	12-18, High Street More images	Q26479840
19a, High Street, 19, High Street	II	19a, High Street, 19, High Street			4 June 1976	TR0113442755; 51°08′55″N 0°52′28″E		1071085	Upload Photo	Q26325965
21, High Street	II	21, High Street, 23, High Street			4 June 1976	TR0112542764; 51°08′56″N 0°52′27″E		1184430	Upload Photo	Q26479756
25, High Street	II	25, High Street, 27, High Street			24 September 1951	TR0111342772; 51°08′56″N 0°52′27″E		1362830	25, High Street More images	Q26644694
Whitehall	II	25a, High Street			4 June 1976	TR0111742760; 51°08′56″N 0°52′27″E		1071086	Upload Photo	Q26325966
31, High Street	II	31, High Street, 31A, High Street			4 June 1976	TR0110442778; 51°08′56″N 0°52′26″E		1184461	31, High Street More images	Q26479786
32, High Street	II	32, High Street			1 September 1989	TR0110742817; 51°08′57″N 0°52′27″E		1362878	32, High Street More images	Q26644741
46, High Street	II	46, High Street			4 June 1976	TR0108042842; 51°08′58″N 0°52′25″E		1071092	46, High Street More images	Q26325982
48, High Street	II	48, High Street, 50, High Street, 52, High Street			15 April 1975	TR0106042836; 51°08′58″N 0°52′24″E		1071093	48, High Street More images	Q26325985
51-55, High Street	II*	51-55, High Street			24 September 1951	TR0105142770; 51°08′56″N 0°52′24″E		1362831	51-55, High Street More images	Q17556926
54, High Street	II	54, High Street			24 September 1951	TR0105242819; 51°08′58″N 0°52′24″E		1184522	Upload Photo	Q26479848
57, High Street	II	57, High Street, 59, High Street			4 June 1976	TR0102242776; 51°08′56″N 0°52′22″E		1184478	57, High Street More images	Q26479805
61a, High Street	II	61, High Street, 61A, High Street			4 June 1976	TR0101842777; 51°08′56″N 0°52′22″E		1362832	61a, High Street More images	Q26644695
63, High Street	II	63, High Street			24 September 1951	TR0101342778; 51°08′56″N 0°52′22″E		1071087	63, High Street More images	Q26325969
65, High Street	II	65, High Street			4 June 1976	TR0100842779; 51°08′56″N 0°52′21″E		1184493	65, High Street More images	Q26479820
67, High Street	II	67, High Street, 67A, High Street, 69, High Street, 71, High Street			13 February 1973	TR0099242783; 51°08′56″N 0°52′21″E		1071088	67, High Street More images	Q26325972
The George Hotel	II	68, High Street			24 September 1951	TR0098542838; 51°08′58″N 0°52′20″E		1071094	The George Hotel More images	Q26325988
75, High Street	II	75, High Street			4 June 1976	TR0097642791; 51°08′57″N 0°52′20″E		1071089	75, High Street More images	Q26325974
Rear Part of No 75	II	75, High Street			4 June 1976	TR0097542779; 51°08′56″N 0°52′20″E		1184502	Upload Photo	Q26479829
83a, High Street	II	83, 83A, 85 and 87, High Street			4 June 1976	TR0092742809; 51°08′57″N 0°52′17″E		1071090	83a, High Street More images	Q26325977
91, High Street	II*	89, High Street, 91, High Street			24 September 1951	TR0091042816; 51°08′58″N 0°52′16″E		1184508	91, High Street More images	Q17556332
96, High Street	II	96, High Street, 98, High Street			4 June 1976	TR0090142857; 51°08′59″N 0°52′16″E		1362833	96, High Street More images	Q26644696
100-102, High Street	II	100-102, High Street			4 June 1976	TR0088742861; 51°08′59″N 0°52′15″E		1300084	100-102, High Street More images	Q26587417
K6 Telephone Kiosk Near Man of Kent Public House	II	High Street			25 August 1987	TR0103642802; 51°08′57″N 0°52′23″E		1221256	K6 Telephone Kiosk Near Man of Kent Public House More images	Q26515665
350, Hythe Road	II	350, Hythe Road			24 September 1951	TR0281542138; 51°08′33″N 0°53′53″E		1184565	Upload Photo	Q26479890
Dunn's Hill House	II	407, Hythe Road			24 September 1951	TR0321441991; 51°08′28″N 0°54′13″E		1362834	Upload Photo	Q26644697
Former Fox Public House	II	278, Hythe Road, Willesborough, TN24 0QR			4 June 1976	TR0252642291; 51°08′39″N 0°53′38″E		1071096	Former Fox Public House More images	Q26325992
Hewitt House	II	331, Hythe Road			4 June 1976	TR0282642159; 51°08′34″N 0°53′54″E		1071095	Upload Photo	Q26325990
Summerhill	II	Hythe Road			4 June 1976	TR0413241449; 51°08′09″N 0°54′59″E		1300063	Upload Photo	Q26587398
Willesborough Windmill	II*	Hythe Road, Willesborough			24 September 1951	TR0312942132; 51°08′33″N 0°54′09″E		1184561	Willesborough Windmill More images	Q7010396
Stone Setts, Balustraded Piers and Curved Stairs Adjoining the Hubert Fountain	II	Jemmett Road, TN23 4QD			17 May 2016	TR0053442259; 51°08′40″N 0°51′56″E		1433682	Upload Photo	Q26677956
38, Kennington Road	II	38, Kennington Road, Willesborough			4 June 1976	TR0339042444; 51°08′42″N 0°54′23″E		1071097	Upload Photo	Q26325995
52-60, Kennington Road	II	52-60, Kennington Road, Willesborough			4 June 1976	TR0331942549; 51°08′46″N 0°54′20″E		1184568	Upload Photo	Q26479893
93-97, Kennington Road	II	93-97, Kennington Road			4 June 1976	TR0320942874; 51°08′57″N 0°54′15″E		1071020	Upload Photo	Q26325758
Brisley Rise	II	Kennington Road, Willesborough			4 June 1976	TR0319942783; 51°08′54″N 0°54′14″E		1071061	Upload Photo	Q26325898
Holly Tree House	II	Kennington Road, Willesborough			4 June 1976	TR0330642564; 51°08′46″N 0°54′19″E		1362835	Upload Photo	Q26644698
Kenway	II	81, Kennington Road, Willesborough Lees			4 June 1976	TR0321542832; 51°08′55″N 0°54′15″E		1299897	Upload Photo	Q26587249
Lees Farmhouse	II	Kennington Road, Willesborough			4 June 1976	TR0325542680; 51°08′50″N 0°54′17″E		1071059	Upload Photo	Q26325891
Lees House	II	Kennington Road, Willesborough			24 September 1951	TR0325942637; 51°08′49″N 0°54′17″E		1362855	Upload Photo	Q26644718
Rosemary	II	Kennington Road, Willesborough			4 June 1976	TR0328642607; 51°08′48″N 0°54′18″E		1071098	Upload Photo	Q26325997
Shepway	II	Kennington Road, Willesborough			24 September 1951	TR0323042709; 51°08′51″N 0°54′15″E		1362856	Upload Photo	Q26644719
Stables to Lees Farmhouse	II	Kennington Road, Willesborough			4 June 1976	TR0324842705; 51°08′51″N 0°54′16″E		1071060	Upload Photo	Q26325895
1-5, Kings Parade	II	1-5, Kings Parade			4 June 1976	TR0099642806; 51°08′57″N 0°52′21″E		1071062	1-5, Kings Parade More images	Q26325902
1-3, Knott's Square	II	1-3, Knott's Square, North Street			4 June 1976	TR0107342895; 51°09′00″N 0°52′25″E		1071036	Upload Photo	Q26325807
13-19, Lees Road	II	13-19, Lees Road, Willesborough			4 June 1976	TR0348442148; 51°08′33″N 0°54′27″E		1362858	Upload Photo	Q26644721
Barrowhill House	II	1, Maidstone Road			4 June 1976	TR0041043185; 51°09′10″N 0°51′51″E		1362859	Upload Photo	Q26644722
1, 1a, Middle Row	II	1, Middle Row			24 September 1951	TR0104742799; 51°08′57″N 0°52′23″E		1071065	1, 1a, Middle Row More images	Q26325912
1b, Middle Row	II	1b, Middle Row			4 June 1976	TR0103842799; 51°08′57″N 0°52′23″E		1362860	1b, Middle Row More images	Q26644723
2, Middle Row	II	2, Middle Row (see Details for Further Address Information)			4 June 1976	TR0103042805; 51°08′57″N 0°52′23″E		1224812	2, Middle Row More images	Q26518963
3, Middle Row	II	3, Middle Row			4 June 1976	TR0102542807; 51°08′57″N 0°52′22″E		1266646	3, Middle Row More images	Q26557119
4, Middle Row	II	4, Middle Row			24 September 1951	TR0101642804; 51°08′57″N 0°52′22″E		1224815	4, Middle Row More images	Q26518966
7, Middle Row	II	7, Middle Row			4 June 1976	TR0101342795; 51°08′57″N 0°52′22″E		1184582	7, Middle Row More images	Q26479912
8, Middle Row	II	8, Middle Row			4 June 1976	TR0102042794; 51°08′57″N 0°52′22″E		1071066	8, Middle Row More images	Q26325917
10, 12, Middle Row	II	10, 12, Middle Row			24 September 1951	TR0103642790; 51°08′57″N 0°52′23″E		1071067	10, 12, Middle Row More images	Q26325921
11, Middle Row	II	11, Middle Row			4 June 1976	TR0103842790; 51°08′57″N 0°52′23″E		1300040	11, Middle Row More images	Q26587378
13, Middle Row	II	13, Middle Row			4 June 1976	TR0104542788; 51°08′57″N 0°52′23″E		1300042	13, Middle Row More images	Q26587380
2, New Rents	II	2, New Rents			4 June 1976	TR0081442874; 51°09′00″N 0°52′12″E		1071070	Upload Photo	Q26325933
4, 4a, New Rents	II	4, New Rents			4 June 1976	TR0080842872; 51°09′00″N 0°52′11″E		1071071	4, 4a, New Rents More images	Q26325937
33, New Rents	II	33, New Rents			4 June 1976	TR0074542882; 51°09′00″N 0°52′08″E		1184631	33, New Rents More images	Q26479961
15, Castle Street	II	1, New Street, 15, Castle Street			4 June 1976	TR0085042895; 51°09′00″N 0°52′13″E		1300200	15, Castle Street More images	Q26587525
3 and 5, New Street	II	3 and 5, New Street			4 June 1976	TR0083542896; 51°09′00″N 0°52′13″E		1071072	Upload Photo	Q26325938
7, New Street	II	7, New Street			4 June 1976	TR0083142887; 51°09′00″N 0°52′13″E		1184659	7, New Street More images	Q26479988
8, New Street	II	8, New Street			4 June 1976	TR0085342937; 51°09′02″N 0°52′14″E		1184673	8, New Street More images	Q26480001
Tank Situated in Centre of New Street	II	New Street			4 June 1976	TR0085842916; 51°09′01″N 0°52′14″E		1184646	Tank Situated in Centre of New Street More images	Q26479976
7, North Street	II	7, North Street			24 September 1951	TR0103542895; 51°09′00″N 0°52′23″E		1184691	7, North Street More images	Q26480019
9, North Street	II	9, North Street			24 September 1951	TR0103542904; 51°09′00″N 0°52′23″E		1071076	9, North Street	Q26325948
12 New Street	II	12, New Street, TN24 8UU			4 June 1976	TR0084042927; 51°09′01″N 0°52′13″E		1071075	12 New Street More images	Q26325946
17, New Street	II	17, New Street			4 June 1976	TR0079642910; 51°09′01″N 0°52′11″E		1071073	17, New Street More images	Q26325941
19, New Street	II	19, New Street			4 June 1976	TR0079042914; 51°09′01″N 0°52′10″E		1071074	19, New Street More images	Q26325944
11, North Street	II	11, North Street			24 September 1951	TR0103442912; 51°09′01″N 0°52′23″E		1071077	11, North Street More images	Q26325950
13, North Street	II	13, North Street			24 September 1951	TR0103542926; 51°09′01″N 0°52′23″E		1184696	13, North Street More images	Q26480024
14, North Street	II	14, North Street			18 June 1971	TR0106842892; 51°09′00″N 0°52′25″E		1362863	14, North Street More images	Q26644726
18, North Street	II	16, North Street, 18, North Street			18 June 1971	TR0106142904; 51°09′00″N 0°52′24″E		1184708	18, North Street More images	Q26480034
20, North Street	II	20, North Street			24 September 1951	TR0107242909; 51°09′00″N 0°52′25″E		1362884	Upload Photo	Q26644746
22, North Street	II*	22, North Street			24 September 1951	TR0106842917; 51°09′01″N 0°52′25″E		1071037	22, North Street More images	Q17556103
24, North Street	II	24, North Street			18 June 1971	TR0106242928; 51°09′01″N 0°52′24″E		1071038	24, North Street More images	Q26325811
26, North Street	II	26, North Street			18 June 1971	TR0106442933; 51°09′01″N 0°52′25″E		1362846	26, North Street More images	Q26644709
28, North Street	II	28, North Street			18 June 1971	TR0106442940; 51°09′01″N 0°52′25″E		1071039	28, North Street More images	Q26325816
30, North Street	II	30, North Street			18 June 1971	TR0106742948; 51°09′02″N 0°52′25″E		1362847	30, North Street More images	Q26644710
The Masonic Temple and North Street Hall	II	32, North Street			18 June 1971	TR0108542958; 51°09′02″N 0°52′26″E		1071040	The Masonic Temple and North Street Hall More images	Q26325819
K6 Telephone Kiosk Adjoining Baldwin's Travel Agency in Churchyard	II	Parish Church Yard			7 December 1989	TR0105942764; 51°08′56″N 0°52′24″E		1221245	K6 Telephone Kiosk Adjoining Baldwin's Travel Agency in Churchyard More images	Q26515656
Beaver Cottage	II	Rigden Road, South Ashford			4 June 1976	TR0051041051; 51°08′01″N 0°51′52″E		1071041	Upload Photo	Q26325823
50-52, Romney Road	II	50-52, Romney Road, Willesborough			24 January 2001	TR0238142217; 51°08′36″N 0°53′31″E		1389133	Upload Photo	Q26668576
Barn at Court Lodge to North West of the House and Adjoining the Preceding Barn on the West	II	Sevington Road, Willesborough			4 June 1976	TR0294341491; 51°08′12″N 0°53′58″E		1362850	Upload Photo	Q26644713
Barn to North West of Court Lodge	II	Sevington Road, Willesborough			4 June 1976	TR0296641488; 51°08′12″N 0°53′59″E		1071043	Upload Photo	Q26325827
Court Lodge	II	Sevington Road, Willesborough			4 June 1976	TR0298441465; 51°08′11″N 0°54′00″E		1362849	Upload Photo	Q26644712
Statue of William Harvey in Grounds of William Harvey Public House	II	Sevington Road, Willesborough			4 June 1976	TR0298341556; 51°08′14″N 0°54′00″E		1071044	Upload Photo	Q26325831
The William Harvey Public House	II	Sevington Road			24 September 1951	TR0296041569; 51°08′15″N 0°53′59″E		1184765	The William Harvey Public House More images	Q26480087
33 and 35, Silver Hill Road	II	33 and 35, Silver Hill Road, Willesborough			4 June 1976	TR0335042401; 51°08′41″N 0°54′21″E		1299966	Upload Photo	Q26587311
54, Silver Hill Road (see Details for Further Address Information)	II	52, Silver Hill Road			4 June 1976	TR0330842509; 51°08′45″N 0°54′19″E		1071046	Upload Photo	Q26325839
56, Silver Hill Road (see Details for Further Address Information)	II	56, Silver Hill Road			4 June 1976	TR0331742528; 51°08′45″N 0°54′20″E		1184813	Upload Photo	Q26480130
Hooden on the Hill	II	24, Silver Hill Road, Willesborough, TN24 0NY			4 June 1976	TR0332742336; 51°08′39″N 0°54′20″E		1071045	Upload Photo	Q26325836
Former Industrial Building Belonging to Knowles Removals and Storage	II	Station Approach, TN23 1EZ			4 June 1976	TR0116542318; 51°08′41″N 0°52′29″E		1071048	Former Industrial Building Belonging to Knowles Removals and Storage More images	Q26325847
Disused Graveyard	II	Station Road			4 June 1976	TR0118142671; 51°08′53″N 0°52′30″E		1071047	Disused Graveyard More images	Q26325845
Whist House	II*	Tannery Lane			24 September 1951	TR0134542465; 51°08′46″N 0°52′38″E		1299918	Upload Photo	Q17556857
8-12, the Churchyard	II	8-12, The Churchyard			4 June 1976	TR0098542720; 51°08′54″N 0°52′20″E		1362844	8-12, the Churchyard More images	Q26644707
14, the Churchyard	II	14, The Churchyard			4 June 1976	TR0098042739; 51°08′55″N 0°52′20″E		1300156	Upload Photo	Q26587482
15, The Churchyard	II	15, The Churchyard			4 June 1976	TR0098042743; 51°08′55″N 0°52′20″E		1362845	15, The Churchyard More images	Q26644708
16, The Churchyard	II	16, 17, The Churchyard			4 June 1976	TR0098242747; 51°08′55″N 0°52′20″E		1300157	16, The Churchyard More images	Q26587483
7, the Churchyard	II	6, 7, The Churchyard			19 September 1969	TR0100442712; 51°08′54″N 0°52′21″E		1184348	7, the Churchyard More images	Q26479671
Churchyard of Parish Church of St Mary the Virgin	II	The Churchyard			4 June 1976	TR0103242714; 51°08′54″N 0°52′22″E		1184294	Churchyard of Parish Church of St Mary the Virgin More images	Q26479618
Parish Church of St Mary the Virgin	I	The Churchyard			24 September 1951	TR0102042744; 51°08′55″N 0°52′22″E		1071114	Parish Church of St Mary the Virgin More images	Q17529263
Talbot House	II	13, The Churchyard			24 September 1951	TR0097442735; 51°08′55″N 0°52′20″E		1071117	Talbot House More images	Q26326031
The Clergy House	II	The Churchyard			19 July 1970	TR0103342696; 51°08′54″N 0°52′23″E		1071116	The Clergy House More images	Q26326028
The College	II*	The Churchyard			24 September 1951	TR0106142703; 51°08′54″N 0°52′24″E		1184332	The College More images	Q17556328
The Doctor Wilks Memorial Hall	II*	The Churchyard			24 September 1951	TR0098042760; 51°08′56″N 0°52′20″E		1071118	The Doctor Wilks Memorial Hall More images	Q17556120
The Railings of the Churchyard of the Parish Church of St Mary the Virgin	II	The Churchyard			18 June 1971	TR0105442741; 51°08′55″N 0°52′24″E		1362843	The Railings of the Churchyard of the Parish Church of St Mary the Virgin More images	Q26644706
Wall to South West of the College	II	The Churchyard			4 June 1976	TR0103942678; 51°08′53″N 0°52′23″E		1071115	Upload Photo	Q26326027
121,123, the Street	II	121, 123, The Street, Willesborough			4 June 1976	TR0405841651; 51°08′16″N 0°54′56″E		1362875	Upload Photo	Q26644738
130,132,134, the Street	II	130, 132, 134, The Street, Willesborough			4 June 1976	TR0409641740; 51°08′19″N 0°54′58″E		1071056	Upload Photo	Q26325878
146,148,150, the Street	II	146, 148, 150, The Street, Willesborough			4 June 1976	TR0408441650; 51°08′16″N 0°54′57″E		1184893	Upload Photo	Q26480203
81, the Street	II	81, The Street, Willesborough			4 June 1976	TR0382641829; 51°08′22″N 0°54′44″E		1362854	Upload Photo	Q26644717
Barn to South East of Lacton Farmhouse	II	The Street, Willesborough			4 June 1976	TR0395641792; 51°08′21″N 0°54′51″E		1184909	Upload Photo	Q26480219
Former Oast House to East of Lacton Farmhouse	II	The Street, Willesborough, TN24 0NA			4 June 1976	TR0397841797; 51°08′21″N 0°54′52″E		1071058	Former Oast House to East of Lacton Farmhouse More images	Q26325887
Lacton Farmhouse	II	The Street, Willesborough			4 June 1976	TR0395141816; 51°08′21″N 0°54′51″E		1184900	Upload Photo	Q26480210
Lacton Hall	II	The Street, Willesborough			24 September 1951	TR0370241895; 51°08′24″N 0°54′38″E		1184868	Upload Photo	Q26480179
The Blacksmith's Arms Public House	II	84, The Street, Willesborough			4 June 1976	TR0387541855; 51°08′23″N 0°54′47″E		1299936	The Blacksmith's Arms Public House More images	Q26587284
The Street House	II	The Street, Willesborough			4 June 1976	TR0385341860; 51°08′23″N 0°54′46″E		1071055	Upload Photo	Q26325874
Tollgate Cottage	II	The Street, Willesborough			8 May 2002	TR0407141606; 51°08′14″N 0°54′56″E		1390068	Upload Photo	Q26669488
Walnut Tree House	II	The Street, Willesborough			24 September 1951	TR0408341575; 51°08′13″N 0°54′57″E		1071057	Upload Photo	Q26325883
Little Folly	II	The Street #, Willesborough			4 June 1976	TR0406241748; 51°08′19″N 0°54′56″E		1071017	Upload Photo	Q26325752
21, Tufton Street	II	21, Tufton Street			4 June 1976	TR0096142707; 51°08′54″N 0°52′19″E		1184928	Upload Photo	Q26480238
Hubert Fountain	II*	Victoria Park, TN23 4DQ			4 June 1976	TR0053442259; 51°08′40″N 0°51′56″E		1071019	Hubert Fountain More images	Q26268168
Church of St Mary the Virgin	II*	Willesborough			24 September 1951	TR0292341529; 51°08′13″N 0°53′57″E		1071042	Church of St Mary the Virgin More images	Q26268169
Sandy Lane Cottages	II	1-3 Sandy Lane, Willesborough, TN24 0NJ			4 June 1976	TR0364642232; 51°08′35″N 0°54′36″E		1362857	Upload Photo	Q26644720

== See also ==
- Grade I listed buildings in Kent
- Grade II* listed buildings in Kent

== Sources ==
- Newman, John (2012) [1969], Kent: West and the Weald, The Buildings of England, New Haven and London: Yale University Press, ISBN 978-0-300-18509-6
