= Brook, Kent =

Coordinates: 51.1606°N 0.9531°E

Brook
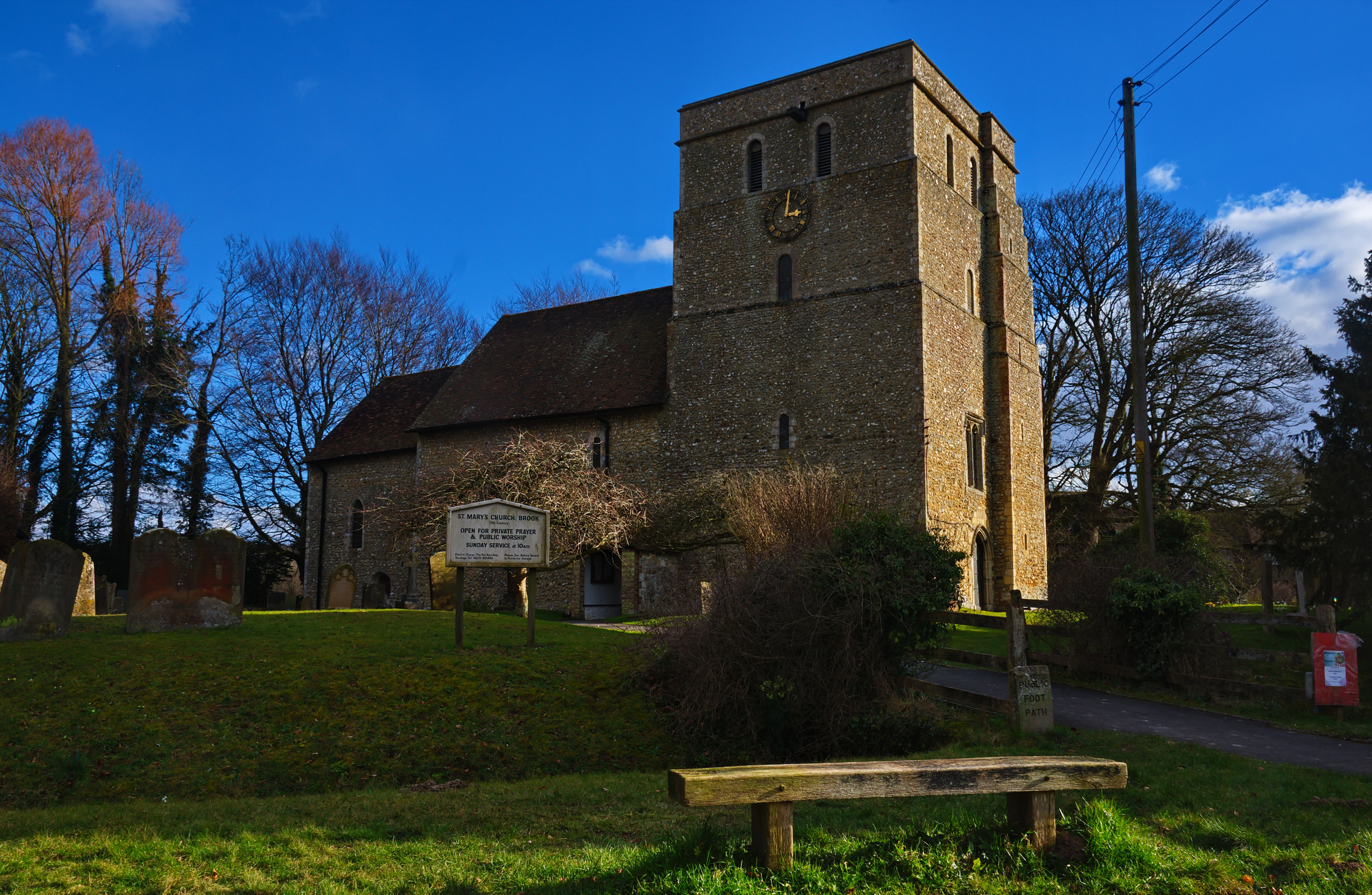
- St Mary's Church, Brook

- Location within Kent
- Area: 4.01 km^{2} (1.55 sq mi)
- Population: 310 (Civil Parish 2011)
  - Density: 77/km^{2} (200/sq mi)
- District: Ashford
- Shire county: Kent
- Region: South East
- Country: England
- Sovereign state: United Kingdom
- Post town: ASHFORD
- Postcode district: TN25
- Dialling code: 01233
- Police: Kent
- Fire: Kent
- Ambulance: South East Coast
- UK Parliament: Ashford

Brook is a small village and civil parish in the borough of Ashford in Kent, England, centred 4.5 miles (7.2 km) east-northeast of the town of Ashford.

== Geography ==
Brook is in a gently rolling valley top immediately south of the North Downs. The brook referred to rises here and flows east to join the combined East and West Stour, that is, the River Great Stour. The south-east fifth of the parish is woodland. The human population of this area rose by 3 during the 10 years to the 2011 United Kingdom census.

== Brook Rural Museum ==
The Brook Rural Museum conserves and exhibits the agricultural and rural history of East Kent. Its collections date from the 18th century and tell the story of farming and rural life in the Garden of England from the age of the horse through to the Industrial Revolution and beyond. It is housed in a magnificent 14th-century grange barn and a 19th-century oast house and managed by the Wye Rural Museum Trust.

== History ==
The 11th century Grade I listed parish church is dedicated to St Mary. There is also a Baptist chapel. The church of St. Mary, erected about 1075, is of stone, in the Early Norman style, and has a tower containing 3 bells: the tower was struck by lightning in 1896, and the northwest corner destroyed, but was restored in 1899: there are 160 sittings. John Betjeman described the church as "unaltered early Norman church ... a massive church which carries its longevity more convincingly than many older and tidier churches".

== See also ==
- Listed buildings in Brook
