= Listed buildings in Charing =

Historic structures in Kent, England

Charing is a village and civil parish in the Borough of Ashford of Kent, England. It contains six grade I, twelve grade II* and 99 grade II listed buildings that are recorded in the National Heritage List for England.

This list is based on the information retrieved online from Historic England

== Key ==
| Grade | Criteria |
|---|---|
| I | Buildings that are of exceptional interest |
| II* | Particularly important buildings of more than special interest |
| II | Buildings that are of special interest |

== Listing ==
| Name | Grade | Location | Type | Completed (Note: The date given is the date used by Historic England as significant for the initial building or that of an important part in the structure's description.) | Date designated | Grid ref. (Note: The grid reference is based on the British national grid reference system, sometimes known as OSGB36, used by the Ordnance Survey.) Geo-coordinates | Notes | Entry number (Note: The "List Entry Number" is a unique number assigned to each listed building and scheduled monument by Historic England.) | Image | Wikidata |
|---|---|---|---|---|---|---|---|---|---|---|
| Eliza Cottages | II | 1 and 2, Ashford Road | | | 10 October 1980 | TQ9528549316; 51°12′35″N 0°47′40″E | | 1366085 | Upload Photo | Q26647717 |
| 18 and 18a, Ashford Road | II | 18 and 18a, Ashford Road | | | 14 February 1967 | TQ9526149322; 51°12′35″N 0°47′39″E | | 1185793 | Upload Photo | Q26481091 |
| Granary to South East of Harrison's Farmhouse | II | Ashford Road | | | 10 October 1980 | TQ9608848086; 51°11′54″N 0°48′19″E | | 1070768 | Upload Photo | Q26325149 |
| Harrison's Farmhouse | II | Ashford Road | | | 10 October 1980 | TQ9606748109; 51°11′55″N 0°48′18″E | | 1185527 | Upload Photo | Q26480845 |
| Tanner's Lodge | II | Ashford Road | | | 14 February 1967 | TQ9527249311; 51°12′35″N 0°47′39″E | | 1070765 | Upload Photo | Q26325139 |
| The Moat House | II | 1-5, Ashford Road | | | 10 October 1980 | TQ9534849251; 51°12′33″N 0°47′43″E | | 1299658 | Upload Photo | Q26587033 |
| Walnut Tree Farmhouse | II | Ashford Road | | | 14 February 1967 | TQ9637447538; 51°11′36″N 0°48′33″E | | 1362990 | Upload Photo | Q26644845 |
| Weatherboared Barn to North East of Harrison's Farmhouse | II | Ashford Road | | | 10 October 1980 | TQ9609648125; 51°11′55″N 0°48′19″E | | 1185540 | Upload Photo | Q26480858 |
| Willow Cottage | II | Ashford Road | | | 14 February 1967 | TQ9529749310; 51°12′35″N 0°47′41″E | | 1070766 | Upload Photo | Q26325143 |
| Barnfield | II | Barnfield Road | | | 10 October 1980 | TQ9237747673; 51°11′45″N 0°45′07″E | | 1070769 | Upload Photo | Q26325152 |
| Foxen Farmhouse | II | Barnfield Road | | | 14 February 1967 | TQ9226848519; 51°12′13″N 0°45′03″E | | 1299629 | Upload Photo | Q26587009 |
| Payne Street | II | Barnfield Road | | | 10 October 1980 | TQ9232347446; 51°11′38″N 0°45′04″E | | 1185550 | Upload Photo | Q26480868 |
| Southfield | II | Barnfield Road | | | 10 October 1980 | TQ9197048103; 51°12′00″N 0°44′47″E | | 1362991 | Upload Photo | Q26644846 |
| Timber Framed Barn to North East of Tram Hatch | II | Barnfield Road | | | 10 October 1980 | TQ9237947491; 51°11′39″N 0°45′07″E | | 1185552 | Upload Photo | Q26480870 |
| Tram Hatch | II* | Barnfield Road | | | 10 October 1980 | TQ9234747474; 51°11′39″N 0°45′05″E | | 1070770 | Upload Photo | Q17556066 |
| Charing Windmill | II | Bowl Road | | | 14 February 1967 | TQ9579750156; 51°13′01″N 0°48′08″E | | 1299636 | Charing Windmill More images | Q5074362 |
| Forge House | II | Charing Heath Road, Charing Heath | | | 14 February 1967 | TQ9278449138; 51°12′32″N 0°45′31″E | | 1185563 | Upload Photo | Q26480883 |
| Little Swan Street Farmhouse | II | Charing Heath Road | | | 10 October 1980 | TQ9337249130; 51°12′31″N 0°46′01″E | | 1070771 | Upload Photo | Q26325155 |
| Swan Street | II | Charing Heath Road | | | 10 October 1980 | TQ9330249127; 51°12′31″N 0°45′58″E | | 1185562 | Upload Photo | Q26480882 |
| The Red Lion Inn | II | Charing Heath Road | | | 14 February 1967 | TQ9286149217; 51°12′35″N 0°45′35″E | | 1362992 | The Red Lion Inn More images | Q26644847 |
| Cherry Tree Cottage | II | Cherry Tree Road, Charing Heath | | | 10 October 1980 | TQ9304549441; 51°12′42″N 0°45′45″E | | 1186181 | Upload Photo | Q26481449 |
| Church Hill Cottage | II | Church Hill, Charing Heath | | | 10 October 1980 | TQ9250249337; 51°12′39″N 0°45′17″E | | 1362993 | Upload Photo | Q26644848 |
| Church of the Holy Trinity | II | Church Hill, Charing Heath | | | 10 October 1980 | TQ9224849432; 51°12′42″N 0°45′04″E | | 1070772 | Church of the Holy Trinity More images | Q26325158 |
| Fayre Acre | II | Church Hill, Charing Heath | | | 10 October 1980 | TQ9243349367; 51°12′40″N 0°45′13″E | | 1070773 | Upload Photo | Q26325161 |
| The Thatched Cottage | II | Church Hill, Charing Heath | | | 10 October 1980 | TQ9246949353; 51°12′39″N 0°45′15″E | | 1185598 | Upload Photo | Q26480915 |
| Brook Farm House | II | Dog Kennel Lane, TN27 0HS | | | 10 October 1980 | TQ9546648714; 51°12′15″N 0°47′48″E | | 1070767 | Upload Photo | Q26325146 |
| Brockton | II | Egerton Road, Charing Heath | | | 10 October 1980 | TQ9219348874; 51°12′24″N 0°45′00″E | | 1185618 | Upload Photo | Q26480931 |
| Brockton Manor | II* | Egerton Road, Charing Heath | | | 14 February 1967 | TQ9242449006; 51°12′28″N 0°45′12″E | | 1070774 | Upload Photo | Q17556068 |
| Weatherboarded Barn to East of Brockton | II | Egerton Road, Charing Heath | | | 10 October 1980 | TQ9222948879; 51°12′24″N 0°45′02″E | | 1362994 | Upload Photo | Q26644849 |
| Yew Tree Farmhouse | II | Egerton Road, Charing Heath | | | 14 February 1967 | TQ9274149175; 51°12′33″N 0°45′29″E | | 1185601 | Upload Photo | Q26480918 |
| Monkery Farmhouse | II | Faversham Road | | | 10 October 1980 | TQ9789351126; 51°13′30″N 0°49′58″E | | 1362996 | Upload Photo | Q26644851 |
| The Waggon and Horses Public House | II | Faversham Road | | | 10 October 1980 | TQ9808551235; 51°13′33″N 0°50′08″E | | 1070777 | Upload Photo | Q26325170 |
| 1 and 3, High Street | II | 1 and 3, High Street | | | 10 October 1980 | TQ9522349297; 51°12′34″N 0°47′37″E | | 1299564 | Upload Photo | Q26586954 |
| 10 and 12, High Street | II | 10 and 12, High Street | | | 14 February 1967 | TQ9524549302; 51°12′34″N 0°47′38″E | | 1185788 | Upload Photo | Q26481087 |
| 11 and 13, High Street | II | 11 and 13, High Street | | | 14 February 1967 | TQ9524549332; 51°12′35″N 0°47′38″E | | 1363017 | Upload Photo | Q26644872 |
| 14 and 16, High Street | II | 14 and 16, High Street | | | 14 February 1967 | TQ9525249313; 51°12′35″N 0°47′38″E | | 1363021 | Upload Photo | Q26644876 |
| 2 and 4, High Street | II | 2 and 4, High Street | | | 10 October 1980 | TQ9523449284; 51°12′34″N 0°47′37″E | | 1363020 | Upload Photo | Q26644875 |
| 20 and 22, High Street | II | 20 and 22, High Street | | | 10 October 1980 | TQ9527349344; 51°12′36″N 0°47′39″E | | 1070750 | Upload Photo | Q26325100 |
| 21,23 and 25, High Street | II | 21, 23 and 25, High Street | | | 14 February 1967 | TQ9526249370; 51°12′37″N 0°47′39″E | | 1070739 | Upload Photo | Q26325077 |
| 24, High Street | II | 24, High Street | | | 10 October 1980 | TQ9527549352; 51°12′36″N 0°47′40″E | | 1185801 | Upload Photo | Q26481098 |
| 30 and 32, High Street | II | 30 and 32, High Street | | | 14 February 1967 | TQ9528649376; 51°12′37″N 0°47′40″E | | 1185804 | Upload Photo | Q26481101 |
| 38-42, High Street | II | 38-42, High Street | | | 10 October 1980 | TQ9529349399; 51°12′37″N 0°47′41″E | | 1185809 | Upload Photo | Q26481106 |
| 39-43, High Street | II | 39-43, High Street | | | 14 February 1967 | TQ9528549429; 51°12′38″N 0°47′40″E | | 1299532 | Upload Photo | Q26586926 |
| 44-48, High Street | II | 44-48, High Street | | | 10 October 1980 | TQ9529849412; 51°12′38″N 0°47′41″E | | 1070752 | Upload Photo | Q26325106 |
| 45, High Street | II | 45, High Street | | | 25 July 1978 | TQ9528949443; 51°12′39″N 0°47′40″E | | 1070744 | Upload Photo | Q26325086 |
| 47, High Street | II | 47, High Street | | | 14 February 1967 | TQ9529149454; 51°12′39″N 0°47′41″E | | 1070745 | Upload Photo | Q26325089 |
| 5 High Street | II | 5, High Street, TN27 0HU | | | 10 October 1980 | TQ9523549316; 51°12′35″N 0°47′37″E | | 1070736 | 5 High Street More images | Q26325067 |
| 50, High Street | II | 50, High Street | | | 14 February 1967 | TQ9530149425; 51°12′38″N 0°47′41″E | | 1185816 | Upload Photo | Q26481112 |
| 52 and 54, High Street | II | 52 and 54, High Street | | | 14 February 1967 | TQ9531049438; 51°12′39″N 0°47′41″E | | 1070753 | Upload Photo | Q26325109 |
| 56, High Street | II | 56, High Street | | | 10 October 1980 | TQ9531249443; 51°12′39″N 0°47′42″E | | 1362983 | Upload Photo | Q26644841 |
| 6 and 8, High Street | II | 6 and 8, High Street | | | 10 October 1980 | TQ9524149295; 51°12′34″N 0°47′38″E | | 1070749 | Upload Photo | Q26325098 |
| 61, High Street | II | 61, High Street | | | 10 October 1980 | TQ9531449488; 51°12′40″N 0°47′42″E | | 1185774 | Upload Photo | Q26481073 |
| 9, High Street | II | 9, High Street | | | 14 February 1967 | TQ9524149325; 51°12′35″N 0°47′38″E | | 1070737 | Upload Photo | Q26325070 |
| Chesnut House Tea Rooms | II | 19, High Street | | | 14 February 1967 | TQ9525449351; 51°12′36″N 0°47′38″E | | 1363018 | Upload Photo | Q26644873 |
| Elizabethan Court | II | 1-8, High Street | | | 14 February 1967 | TQ9531949457; 51°12′39″N 0°47′42″E | | 1185822 | Upload Photo | Q26481118 |
| Forge House | II | 80, High Street | | | 10 October 1980 | TQ9538249514; 51°12′41″N 0°47′45″E | | 1362984 | Upload Photo | Q26686934 |
| Former Stable to Rear of Nos 27 and 29 (sherborne House) | II | High Street | | | 10 October 1980 | TQ9525349389; 51°12′37″N 0°47′38″E | | 1070741 | Upload Photo | Q26325080 |
| Kings House and Beckett House | II | High Street, TN27 0LS | | | 10 October 1980 | TQ9532549504; 51°12′41″N 0°47′42″E | | 1185780 | Upload Photo | Q26481079 |
| Ludwell House | II* | High Street | | | 17 September 1952 | TQ9529449471; 51°12′40″N 0°47′41″E | | 1185767 | Ludwell House More images | Q17556400 |
| Mounting Block Opposite Entrance to Pett Lane | II | High Street | | | 10 October 1980 | TQ9542649577; 51°12′43″N 0°47′48″E | | 1070748 | Upload Photo | Q26325095 |
| New House Cottages | II | 1-4, High Street | | | 10 October 1980 | TQ9549049674; 51°12′46″N 0°47′51″E | | 1185786 | Upload Photo | Q26481085 |
| No 59 and Garden Wall to Ludwell House | II | 59, High Street | | | 10 October 1980 | TQ9531349482; 51°12′40″N 0°47′42″E | | 1070746 | Upload Photo | Q26325092 |
| North End Cottage | II | 34 and 36, High Street | | | 14 February 1967 | TQ9528949387; 51°12′37″N 0°47′40″E | | 1363022 | Upload Photo | Q26644877 |
| Old School House | II | 64, High Street | | | 10 October 1980 | TQ9532649474; 51°12′40″N 0°47′42″E | | 1070754 | Upload Photo | Q26325112 |
| Peckwater House | II | 17, High Street | | | 14 February 1967 | TQ9524849344; 51°12′36″N 0°47′38″E | | 1070738 | Upload Photo | Q26325074 |
| Peirce House | II* | 33, High Street | | | 17 September 1952 | TQ9527249423; 51°12′38″N 0°47′40″E | | 1070742 | Peirce House More images | Q17556043 |
| Ridgemount | II | 28, High Street | | | 14 February 1967 | TQ9528049361; 51°12′36″N 0°47′40″E | | 1070751 | Upload Photo | Q26325103 |
| Sherborne House | II* | 27 and 29, High Street | | | 17 September 1952 | TQ9527049387; 51°12′37″N 0°47′39″E | | 1070740 | Sherborne House More images | Q17556039 |
| The White House | II | High Street | | | 14 February 1967 | TQ9531949496; 51°12′41″N 0°47′42″E | | 1363019 | Upload Photo | Q26644874 |
| Wakeley House | II* | High Street | | | 17 September 1952 | TQ9533649517; 51°12′41″N 0°47′43″E | | 1070747 | Upload Photo | Q17556055 |
| Wakeley Villas | II | 1 and 2, High Street | | | 14 February 1967 | TQ9536149520; 51°12′41″N 0°47′44″E | | 1299508 | Wakeley Villas More images | Q26586906 |
| Wheler House | II | High Street | | | 14 February 1967 | TQ9533349485; 51°12′40″N 0°47′43″E | | 1299488 | Upload Photo | Q26586887 |
| Hunger Hatch | II | Hunger Hatch | | | 14 February 1967 | TQ9370447628; 51°11′42″N 0°46′15″E | | 1185831 | Upload Photo | Q26481125 |
| Hunger Hatch Cottage | II | Hunger Hatch | | | 10 October 1980 | TQ9359547477; 51°11′37″N 0°46′09″E | | 1070755 | Upload Photo | Q26325117 |
| Wilks Farmhouse | II | Magazine Road | | | 10 October 1980 | TQ9180149547; 51°12′46″N 0°44′41″E | | 1185842 | Upload Photo | Q26481137 |
| 1 and 2, Market Place | II | 1 and 2, Market Place | | | 14 February 1967 | TQ9530849428; 51°12′38″N 0°47′41″E | | 1071534 | Upload Photo | Q26326738 |
| 3, Market Place | II | 3, Market Place | | | 10 October 1980 | TQ9531449424; 51°12′38″N 0°47′42″E | | 1071535 | Upload Photo | Q26326739 |
| 4 and 5, Market Place | II | 4 and 5, Market Place | | | 10 October 1980 | TQ9532449423; 51°12′38″N 0°47′42″E | | 1071536 | Upload Photo | Q26326741 |
| Barn to South East of Palace Farmhouse | I | Market Place | | | 14 February 1967 | TQ9543649426; 51°12′38″N 0°47′48″E | | 1185861 | Barn to South East of Palace Farmhouse More images | Q17529358 |
| Church of St Peter and St Paul | I | Market Place | | | 14 February 1967 | TQ9544249383; 51°12′37″N 0°47′48″E | | 1362985 | Church of St Peter and St Paul More images | Q17529456 |
| Outhouse to West of Palace Farmhouse | I | Market Place | | | 14 February 1967 | TQ9537749441; 51°12′39″N 0°47′45″E | | 1186008 | Upload Photo | Q17529363 |
| Palace Cottages and the Remains of the Gatehouse Adjoining | I | 1 and 2, Market Place | | | 14 February 1967 | TQ9539249412; 51°12′38″N 0°47′46″E | | 1070757 | Palace Cottages and the Remains of the Gatehouse Adjoining More images | Q17529235 |
| Palace Farmhouse | I | Market Place | | | 14 February 1967 | TQ9541649446; 51°12′39″N 0°47′47″E | | 1070756 | Palace Farmhouse More images | Q17529221 |
| Remains of the Boundary Walls of the Archbishop's Palace | II | Market Place | | | 14 February 1967 | TQ9552149447; 51°12′39″N 0°47′52″E | | 1362627 | Upload Photo | Q26644504 |
| The Old Vicarage Vicarage Cottage | II* | Market Place | | | 14 February 1967 | TQ9550149385; 51°12′37″N 0°47′51″E | | 1185849 | Upload Photo | Q17556405 |
| The Gazebo | II | 2, Monks Walk, TN27 0HT | | | 10 October 1980 | TQ9524349460; 51°12′39″N 0°47′38″E | | 1070743 | Upload Photo | Q26325083 |
| Chapel at Newlands Stud Farm | II* | Newlands Road | | | 17 September 1952 | TQ9362748211; 51°12′01″N 0°46′12″E | | 1071538 | Upload Photo | Q17556252 |
| Newlands Stud Farmhouse | II* | Newlands Road | | | 10 October 1980 | TQ9368748185; 51°12′00″N 0°46′16″E | | 1071537 | Upload Photo | Q17556245 |
| Cherry Cottage Hazel Cottage | II | Pett Lane | | | 10 October 1980 | TQ9609748893; 51°12′20″N 0°48′21″E | | 1186076 | Upload Photo | Q26481349 |
| Pett Place | I | Pett Lane | | | 17 September 1952 | TQ9607649018; 51°12′24″N 0°48′20″E | | 1071539 | Pett Place More images | Q17529319 |
| Ruins of Chapel at Pett Place | II | Pett Lane | | | 14 February 1967 | TQ9611149002; 51°12′24″N 0°48′22″E | | 1071540 | Upload Photo | Q17641243 |
| Tithe Barn to the South East of Pett Place | II* | Pett Lane | | | 14 February 1967 | TQ9614348921; 51°12′21″N 0°48′23″E | | 1362628 | Upload Photo | Q17556890 |
| Broadway Cottages | II | 1 and 2, Pluckley Road | | | 25 February 1981 | TQ9486048881; 51°12′21″N 0°47′17″E | | 1221313 | Upload Photo | Q26515716 |
| Broadway House | II | Pluckley Road | | | 14 February 1967 | TQ9481748802; 51°12′19″N 0°47′15″E | | 1362629 | Upload Photo | Q26644505 |
| Charing Court | II | Pluckley Road, TN27 0AQ | | | 10 October 1980 | TQ9470948671; 51°12′15″N 0°47′09″E | | 1186085 | Upload Photo | Q26481358 |
| Raywood Farmhouse | II | Pluckley Road | | | 10 October 1980 | TQ9456848278; 51°12′02″N 0°47′01″E | | 1071541 | Upload Photo | Q26326744 |
| Rose Villa | II | Pluckley Road | | | 10 October 1980 | TQ9459348432; 51°12′07″N 0°47′03″E | | 1299375 | Upload Photo | Q26586783 |
| Gazebo to Rear of Ludwell House | II | School Road | | | 10 October 1980 | TQ9527849520; 51°12′41″N 0°47′40″E | | 1186100 | Upload Photo | Q26481374 |
| Ledbury House | II | School Road | | | 25 July 1978 | TQ9528149462; 51°12′39″N 0°47′40″E | | 1071542 | Upload Photo | Q26326745 |
| Romney House | II | School Road | | | 10 October 1980 | TQ9527649481; 51°12′40″N 0°47′40″E | | 1362630 | Upload Photo | Q26644506 |
| Stable to the North West of Ledbury House | II | School Road | | | 25 July 1978 | TQ9527149466; 51°12′40″N 0°47′40″E | | 1186092 | Upload Photo | Q26481367 |
| Vent House | II | Stalisfield Road | | | 14 February 1967 | TQ9494851601; 51°13′49″N 0°47′27″E | | 1071543 | Upload Photo | Q26326747 |
| 29-35 Station Road | II | 29-35, Station Road, TN27 0JA | | | 10 October 1980 | TQ9512549204; 51°12′31″N 0°47′32″E | | 1071544 | Upload Photo | Q26326748 |
| Lion Field | II | 21, Station Road, TN27 0JA | | | 14 February 1967 | TQ9514149216; 51°12′32″N 0°47′32″E | | 1186136 | Upload Photo | Q26481409 |
| The Firs | II | Station Road | | | 10 October 1980 | TQ9519249209; 51°12′31″N 0°47′35″E | | 1362593 | Upload Photo | Q26644470 |
| The Old House | II* | Station Road | | | 17 September 1952 | TQ9519449236; 51°12′32″N 0°47′35″E | | 1186103 | The Old House More images | Q17556410 |
| Barn to West of Stonestile | II | Stonestile Farm Road | | | 10 October 1980 | TQ9444651357; 51°13′42″N 0°47′01″E | | 1071545 | Upload Photo | Q26326750 |
| Dormestone | II | Stonestile Farm Road | | | 10 October 1980 | TQ9424951017; 51°13′31″N 0°46′50″E | | 1362594 | Upload Photo | Q26644471 |
| Stonestile | II | Stonestile Farm Road | | | 10 October 1980 | TQ9447451351; 51°13′42″N 0°47′02″E | | 1186143 | Upload Photo | Q26481416 |
| Burleigh Farm Cottages | II | Tile Lodge Road | | | 14 February 1967 | TQ9272149871; 51°12′56″N 0°45′29″E | | 1071546 | Upload Photo | Q26326751 |
| Burleigh Farmhouse | II | Tile Lodge Road | | | 10 October 1980 | TQ9277749717; 51°12′51″N 0°45′32″E | | 1299325 | Upload Photo | Q26586737 |
| Chapel Ruins at Burleigh Farm | II | To The East Of Burleigh Farm Cottages, Tile Lodge Road | | | 14 February 1967 | TQ9274249883; 51°12′56″N 0°45′30″E | | 1299329 | Upload Photo | Q26586741 |
| Forge Cottage Ivy Cottage | II | Westwell Leacon | | | 10 October 1980 | TQ9611047598; 51°11′38″N 0°48′19″E | | 1299336 | Upload Photo | Q26586748 |
| Leacon Farmhouse | II | Westwell Leacon | | | 10 October 1980 | TQ9542547270; 51°11′28″N 0°47′43″E | | 1071547 | Upload Photo | Q26326754 |
| Raywood Cottages | II | Westwell Leacon | | | 10 October 1980 | TQ9480247896; 51°11′49″N 0°47′12″E | | 1362595 | Upload Photo | Q26644472 |
| Rose Cottage | II | Westwell Leacon | | | 10 October 1980 | TQ9538447448; 51°11′34″N 0°47′41″E | | 1186163 | Upload Photo | Q26481433 |
| Wickens Manor | II* | Wicken Lane | | | 17 September 1952 | TQ9602348331; 51°12′02″N 0°48′16″E | | 1071548 | Upload Photo | Q17556256 |

== See also ==
- Grade I listed buildings in Kent
- Grade II* listed buildings in Kent

== Sources ==
- Newman, John (2012) [1969], Kent: West and the Weald, The Buildings of England, New Haven and London: Yale University Press, ISBN 978-0-300-18509-6
