= Listed buildings in Aldington, Kent =

Civil Parish in Kent, England

Aldington is a village and civil parish in the Borough of Ashford of Kent, England. It contains one grade I, three grade II* and 48 grade II listed buildings that are recorded in the National Heritage List for England.

This list is based on the information retrieved online from Historic England.

== Key ==
Grade	Criteria
I	Buildings that are of exceptional interest
II*	Particularly important buildings of more than special interest
II	Buildings that are of special interest

== Listing ==
Name	Grade	Location	Type	Completed (Note: The date given is the date used by Historic England as significant for the initial building or that of an important part in the structure's description.)	Date designated	Grid ref. (Note: The grid reference is based on the British national grid reference system, sometimes known as OSGB36, used by the Ordnance Survey.) Geo-coordinates	Notes	Entry number (Note: The "List Entry Number" is a unique number assigned to each listed building and scheduled monument by Historic England.)	Image	Wikidata
Falconhurst Farmhouse	II				27 November 1957	TR0766334521; 51°04′21″N 0°57′46″E		1071247	Upload Photo	Q26326291
Bank Farmhouse and Walls Attached	II	Bank Road			10 August 1988	TR0544137136; 51°05′48″N 0°55′58″E		1362752	Upload Photo	Q26644622
Barn and 2 Stable Ranges Attached, About 20 Metres North of Bank Farmhouse	II	About 20 Metres North Of Bank Farmhouse, Bank Road			10 August 1988	TR0542437104; 51°05′47″N 0°55′57″E		1071248	Upload Photo	Q26326294
Symnel Cottage	II	Calleywell Lane			14 March 1986	TR0639237440; 51°05′57″N 0°56′47″E		1362753	Upload Photo	Q26644623
The Old Cottage	II	Calleywell Lane			14 April 1986	TR0640537566; 51°06′01″N 0°56′48″E		1071249	Upload Photo	Q26326296
Cherry Orchard	II	Cherry Orchard Lane			10 August 1988	TR0533435895; 51°05′08″N 0°55′50″E		1362774	Upload Photo	Q26644643
Barn About 30 Metres North West of Hogben Farmhouse	II	Church Lane			10 August 1988	TR0753337166; 51°05′46″N 0°57′45″E		1300208	Upload Photo	Q26587532
Barn and Cartsheds About 50 Metres South West of Court Lodge Farmhouse	II	Church Lane			10 August 1988	TR0745436199; 51°05′15″N 0°57′39″E		1362776	Upload Photo	Q26644645
Church Farmhouse	II	Church Lane			27 November 1957	TR0754836324; 51°05′19″N 0°57′44″E		1071211	Upload Photo	Q26326215
Church Hill Cottage	II	Church Lane			10 August 1988	TR0754136413; 51°05′22″N 0°57′44″E		1184281	Upload Photo	Q26479606
Church of St Martin	I	Church Lane, TN25 7EG			10 August 1988	TR0749936183; 51°05′15″N 0°57′41″E		1071208	Church of St Martin More images	Q17529285
Court Lodge Farmhouse	II*	Church Lane			27 November 1957	TR0752036203; 51°05′15″N 0°57′42″E		1071209	Upload Photo	Q17556159
Forehead Farmhouse	II	Church Lane			10 August 1988	TR0750336771; 51°05′34″N 0°57′43″E		1362779	Upload Photo	Q26644648
Former Dairy Building About 25 Metres North West of Hogben Farmhouse	II	Church Lane			10 August 1988	TR0754237155; 51°05′46″N 0°57′46″E		1071213	Upload Photo	Q26326220
Grove Cottage	II	Church Lane			10 August 1988	TR0768936183; 51°05′14″N 0°57′51″E		1071212	Upload Photo	Q26326217
Hogben Farmhouse	II	Church Lane			13 October 1952	TR0755837137; 51°05′45″N 0°57′46″E		1362778	Upload Photo	Q26644647
Hogben House	II	Church Lane			10 August 1988	TR0751036474; 51°05′24″N 0°57′43″E		1071214	Upload Photo	Q26326222
Lychgate and Quadrant Walls Attached to Churchyard of St Martin	II	Church Lane			10 August 1988	TR0739636195; 51°05′15″N 0°57′36″E		1362775	Lychgate and Quadrant Walls Attached to Churchyard of St Martin More images	Q26644644
Oak House	II	Church Lane			27 November 1957	TR0749836809; 51°05′35″N 0°57′43″E		1300182	Upload Photo	Q26587507
Old Chestnut House	II	Church Lane, TN25 7EG			10 August 1988	TR0751836351; 51°05′20″N 0°57′43″E		1300185	Upload Photo	Q26587510
Parsonage Farmhouse	II	Church Lane			27 November 1957	TR0739136127; 51°05′13″N 0°57′36″E		1071207	Upload Photo	Q26326210
Stable/barn About 50 Metres West of Court Lodge Farmhouse	II	Church Lane			10 August 1988	TR0748136237; 51°05′16″N 0°57′41″E		1071210	Upload Photo	Q26326212
Stock Yard and Sheds About 75 Metres West of Court Lodge Farmhouse	II	Church Lane			10 August 1988	TR0745636278; 51°05′18″N 0°57′39″E		1362777	Upload Photo	Q26644646
Street Farmhouse	II	Church Lane			10 August 1988	TR0749636337; 51°05′20″N 0°57′42″E		1071215	Upload Photo	Q26326224
Tickner Cottage	II	Church Lane			10 August 1988	TR0756236317; 51°05′19″N 0°57′45″E		1184279	Upload Photo	Q26479604
1 and 2, Clap Hill	II	1 and 2, Clap Hill			12 February 1985	TR0590236956; 51°05′42″N 0°56′21″E		1184334	Upload Photo	Q26479658
By the Way	II	Clap Hill			10 August 1988	TR0586736916; 51°05′41″N 0°56′19″E		1184361	Upload Photo	Q26479686
Clap Hill House Harold Cottages	II	Clap Hill			10 August 1988	TR0586036955; 51°05′42″N 0°56′19″E		1071216	Upload Photo	Q26326225
Homelands	II	Forge Hill			10 August 1988	TR0597936253; 51°05′19″N 0°56′23″E		1071218	Upload Photo	Q26326229
Shepherd's Cottage Shepherd's House	II	Forge Hill			10 August 1988	TR0610336273; 51°05′19″N 0°56′30″E		1071217	Upload Photo	Q26326228
Walnut Tree Inn	II	Forge Hill			13 October 1952	TR0627736596; 51°05′30″N 0°56′39″E		1300164	Upload Photo	Q26587490
Goodwin Farmhouse	II	Frith Road			10 August 1988	TR0498336911; 51°05′41″N 0°55′34″E		1300136	Upload Photo	Q26587464
Hand Pump About 5 Metres West of Quested's Cottage	II	Frith Road			10 August 1988	TR0521936902; 51°05′41″N 0°55′46″E		1071219	Upload Photo	Q26326232
Oast House About 50 Metres West of Poulton Farmhouse	II	Frith Road			10 August 1988	TR0568236866; 51°05′39″N 0°56′09″E		1300148	Upload Photo	Q26587475
Poulton Farmhouse	II	Frith Road			10 August 1988	TR0572836874; 51°05′39″N 0°56′12″E		1071220	Upload Photo	Q26326235
Quested's Cottage	II	Frith Road			10 August 1988	TR0523136902; 51°05′41″N 0°55′46″E		1184383	Upload Photo	Q26479708
Goldenhurst Manor	II	Giggers Green Road			27 November 1957	TR0686234768; 51°04′30″N 0°57′06″E		1071221	Upload Photo	Q26326238
Goldwell	II	Goldwell Lane			10 August 1988	TR0660237002; 51°05′42″N 0°56′57″E		1184459	Upload Photo	Q26479784
Stable/outhouse About 10 Metres North of Goldwell	II	Goldwell Lane			10 August 1988	TR0659337020; 51°05′43″N 0°56′57″E		1362780	Upload Photo	Q26644649
Symnells and Walled Forecourt	II	Goldwell Lane			13 October 1952	TR0656737267; 51°05′51″N 0°56′56″E		1184484	Upload Photo	Q26479812
Copperhurst	II	Knoll Hill, TN25 7BZ			10 August 1988	TR0730235470; 51°04′52″N 0°57′30″E		1071223	Upload Photo	Q26326242
Little Copperhurst	II	Knoll Hill			10 August 1988	TR0734835487; 51°04′52″N 0°57′32″E		1300109	Upload Photo	Q26587439
Wykhurst	II	Mill Lane			10 August 1988	TR0574436139; 51°05′16″N 0°56′11″E		1071224	Upload Photo	Q26326243
Barton Farm	II	New Road Hill			10 August 1988	TR0569336033; 51°05′12″N 0°56′08″E		1362781	Upload Photo	Q26644650
Pattisons Farmhouse	II	1 and 2, New Road Hill			10 August 1988	TR0602235988; 51°05′10″N 0°56′25″E		1300112	Upload Photo	Q26587442
Barn About 20 Metres East of Ruffyn's Hill Farmhouse	II	Roman Road			10 August 1988	TR0718835988; 51°05′09″N 0°57′25″E		1071225	Upload Photo	Q26326246
Belarica Cottage Beulah	II	Roman Road			10 August 1988	TR0631936568; 51°05′29″N 0°56′42″E		1071226	Upload Photo	Q26326247
Cobb's Hall	II*	Roman Road			13 October 1952	TR0666936276; 51°05′19″N 0°56′59″E		1184555	Upload Photo	Q17556346
Granary/stowage About 35 Metres North East of Ruffyn's Hill Farmhouse	II	Roman Road			10 August 1988	TR0720936019; 51°05′10″N 0°57′26″E		1362782	Upload Photo	Q26644651
Ruffyn's Hill Farmhouse and Walls Projecting	II*	Roman Road			13 October 1952	TR0717036011; 51°05′10″N 0°57′24″E		1184521	Upload Photo	Q17556338
Stable/stock House About 20 Metres North East of Ruffyn's Hill Farmhouse	II	Roman Road			10 August 1988	TR0719636010; 51°05′10″N 0°57′25″E		1184539	Upload Photo	Q26479866
Goldenhurst, the Old House	II	The Old House, Giggers Green Road			27 November 1957	TR0686234786; 51°04′30″N 0°57′06″E		1071222	Upload Photo	Q26326239

== See also ==
- Grade I listed buildings in Kent
- Grade II* listed buildings in Kent

== Sources ==
- Newman, John (2012) [1969], Kent: West and the Weald, The Buildings of England, New Haven and London: Yale University Press, ISBN 978-0-300-18509-6
