= Kenardington =

Village in Kent, England

Coordinates: 51.0623°N 0.8153°E

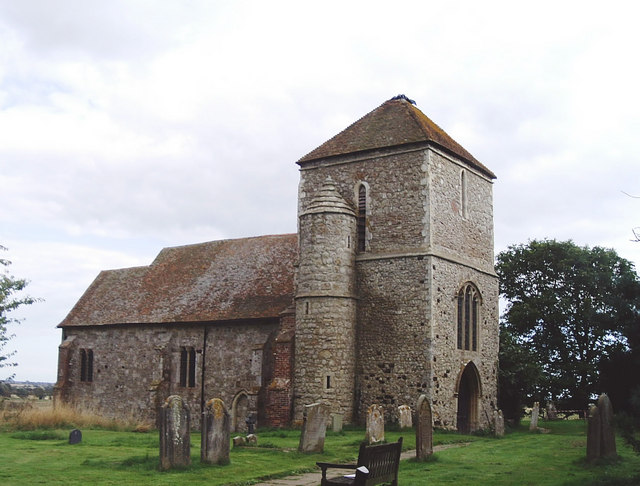
- Church of St Mary

- Location within Kent
- Area: 7.47 km^{2} (2.88 sq mi)
- Population: 283 (Note: This value is for the civil parish in 2021.)
  - Density: 38/km^{2} (98/sq mi)
- OS grid reference: TQ972330
- Civil parish: Kenardington
- District: Ashford
- Shire county: Kent
- Region: South East
- Country: England
- Sovereign state: United Kingdom
- Post town: ASHFORD
- Postcode district: TN26
- Dialling code: 01233
- Police: Kent
- Fire: Kent
- Ambulance: South East Coast
- UK Parliament: Weald of Kent

Kenardington is a small clustered village and the centre of a relatively small rural civil parish of the same name, in the Ashford District of Kent, England. The village is centred 8 miles (13 km) south-west of Ashford on the B2067 Hamstreet to Tenterden road.

== Geography ==
Kenardington is on the edge of Romney Marsh, which its church of St Mary (with its tower dated 1170 AD) overlooks from a hilltop. The site of the church was once the scene of a battle, being stormed by the Danes in the 9th century; it stands on the site of what seems to have been a small Saxon fort, the remains of its earthworks now largely ploughed out of sight in fields used as arable land.

== Amenities ==
Kenardington had a village shop and post office until the 1980s; since then, the nearest shops and railway station are in Hamstreet, approximately 2 miles (3.2 km) away.

The south-west of the parish is a wooded public park and has picnic areas. The Saxon Shore Way and Royal Military Canal pass through.

== See also ==
- Listed buildings in Kenardington
