= Listed buildings in Crundale, Kent =

Historic structures in Kent, England

Crundale is a village and civil parish in the Borough of Ashford of Kent, England. It contains one grade I, one grade II* and 18 grade II listed buildings that are recorded in the National Heritage List for England.

This list is based on the information retrieved online from Historic England.

== Key ==
Grade	Criteria
I	Buildings that are of exceptional interest
II*	Particularly important buildings of more than special interest
II	Buildings that are of special interest

== Listing ==
Name	Grade	Location	Type	Completed (Note: The date given is the date used by Historic England as significant for the initial building or that of an important part in the structure's description.)	Date designated	Grid ref. (Note: The grid reference is based on the British national grid reference system, sometimes known as OSGB36, used by the Ordnance Survey.) Geo-coordinates	Notes	Entry number (Note: The "List Entry Number" is a unique number assigned to each listed building and scheduled monument by Historic England.)	Image	Wikidata
Barn 15 Yards South East of Ripple Farmhouse	II				13 August 1984	TR0673449767; 51°12′35″N 0°57′30″E		1362759	Upload Photo	Q26644629
Church of St Mary	I				27 November 1957	TR0857748599; 51°11′55″N 0°59′03″E		1299607	Church of St Mary More images	Q17529425
Crundale House	II				27 November 1957	TR0824848739; 51°12′00″N 0°58′46″E		1071257	Upload Photo	Q26326313
House 30 Yards West of Ripple Farmhouse	II				13 August 1984	TR0669349819; 51°12′37″N 0°57′28″E		1185630	Upload Photo	Q26480942
Olantigh	II				27 November 1957	TR0652348476; 51°11′53″N 0°57′17″E		1185599	Upload Photo	Q26480916
Ripple Farmhouse	II				27 November 1957	TR0672449793; 51°12′36″N 0°57′30″E		1185624	Upload Photo	Q26480937
Stable Block 15 Yards South West of Winchcombe Manor	II				13 August 1984	TR0846449416; 51°12′21″N 0°58′58″E		1071260	Upload Photo	Q26326322
Thatch Cottage	II				13 August 1984	TR0804549714; 51°12′31″N 0°58′38″E		1071258	Upload Photo	Q26326317
Tomb of Juliana Hervey	II	15 Feet South East Of South East Corner Of Nave			13 August 1984	TR0858848592; 51°11′54″N 0°59′03″E		1362758	Upload Photo	Q26644628
Tomb of Reverend Francis Paine	II	5 Feet East From South East Corner Of Nave			13 August 1984	TR0858448594; 51°11′55″N 0°59′03″E		1071256	Upload Photo	Q26326309
Trimworth Manor	II				27 November 1957	TR0619749746; 51°12′35″N 0°57′02″E		1185642	Upload Photo	Q26480953
Winchcombe Manor North and South	II				13 August 1984	TR0847649446; 51°12′22″N 0°58′59″E		1071259	Upload Photo	Q26326320
Denwood Farmhouse	II	Denwood Street			13 August 1984	TR0776649049; 51°12′10″N 0°58′22″E		1071262	Upload Photo	Q26326326
Farnley Little Barn	II	Denwood Street, Canterbury, CT4 7EF			18 April 2017	TR0776448951; 51°12′07″N 0°58′21″E		1442275	Upload Photo	Q66478443
Glenwood Farmhouse	II	Denwood Street			13 August 1984	TR0784249144; 51°12′13″N 0°58′26″E		1185655	Upload Photo	Q26480965
Old Rectory	II	Denwood Street			13 August 1984	TR0794049294; 51°12′18″N 0°58′31″E		1185649	Upload Photo	Q26480959
Old School House	II	Denwood Street			13 August 1984	TR0780049130; 51°12′13″N 0°58′24″E		1071261	Upload Photo	Q26326324
Hunt Street Farmhouse	II*	Hunt Street			13 October 1952	TR0906848592; 51°11′54″N 0°59′28″E		1185666	Upload Photo	Q17556395
Compasses Inn	II	Sole Street			13 August 1984	TR0971249309; 51°12′16″N 1°00′02″E		1299573	Compasses Inn More images	Q26586962
Solestreet Farmhouse	II	Sole Street			13 August 1984	TR0983849265; 51°12′15″N 1°00′09″E		1071263	Upload Photo	Q26326329

== See also ==
- Grade I listed buildings in Kent
- Grade II* listed buildings in Kent

== Sources ==
- Newman, John (2012) [1969], Kent: West and the Weald, The Buildings of England, New Haven and London: Yale University Press, ISBN 978-0-300-18509-6
