= Listed buildings in Kenardington =

Historic structures in Kent, England

Kenardington is a village and civil parish in the Borough of Ashford of Kent, England. It contains two grade II* and nine grade II listed buildings that are recorded in the National Heritage List for England.

This list is based on the information retrieved online from Historic England.

== Key ==
Grade	Criteria
I	Buildings that are of exceptional interest
II*	Particularly important buildings of more than special interest
II	Buildings that are of special interest

== Listing ==
Name	Grade	Location	Type	Completed (Note: The date given is the date used by Historic England as significant for the initial building or that of an important part in the structure's description.)	Date designated	Grid ref. (Note: The grid reference is based on the British national grid reference system, sometimes known as OSGB36, used by the Ordnance Survey.) Geo-coordinates	Notes	Entry number (Note: The "List Entry Number" is a unique number assigned to each listed building and scheduled monument by Historic England.)	Image	Wikidata
Cherry Croft	II				9 August 1979	TQ9693632542; 51°03′30″N 0°48′32″E		1362914	Upload Photo	Q26644774
Church of St Mary	II*				16 August 1962	TQ9747832132; 51°03′16″N 0°48′59″E		1116484	Church of St Mary More images	Q17556299
High House Farmhouse	II				16 August 1962	TQ9728832981; 51°03′44″N 0°48′51″E		1070937	Upload Photo	Q26325578
Place Farmhouse	II				16 August 1962	TQ9720332876; 51°03′41″N 0°48′46″E		1116497	Upload Photo	Q26410100
Braeside	II	Appledore Road			9 August 1979	TQ9659732069; 51°03′16″N 0°48′14″E		1070939	Upload Photo	Q26325584
Manor Farmhouse	II*	Appledore Road			4 June 1952	TQ9691732344; 51°03′24″N 0°48′31″E		1116469	Upload Photo	Q17556295
Oasthouse at Manor Farm	II	Appledore Road			9 August 1979	TQ9689432403; 51°03′26″N 0°48′30″E		1070938	Upload Photo	Q26325581
Sly Corner	II	Appledore Road			9 August 1979	TQ9651732016; 51°03′14″N 0°48′09″E		1116474	Upload Photo	Q26410081
Barn at Higham Farm to South East of Farmhouse	II	Bridge Road			9 August 1979	TQ9779831399; 51°02′52″N 0°49′14″E		1070941	Upload Photo	Q26325588
Higham Farmhouse	II	Bridge Road			9 August 1979	TQ9776431417; 51°02′53″N 0°49′12″E		1116446	Upload Photo	Q26410058
Smith's Farmhouse	II	Bridge Road			9 August 1979	TQ9697631605; 51°03′00″N 0°48′32″E		1070940	Upload Photo	Q26325585

== See also ==
- Grade I listed buildings in Kent
- Grade II* listed buildings in Kent

== Sources ==
- Newman, John (2012) [1969], Kent: West and the Weald, The Buildings of England, New Haven and London: Yale University Press, ISBN 978-0-300-18509-6
