= Listed buildings in Rolvenden =

Civil Parish in Kent, England

Rolvenden is a village and civil parish in the Borough of Ashford of Kent, England. It contains one grade I, six grade II* and 117 grade II listed buildings that are recorded in the National Heritage List for England.

This list is based on the information retrieved online from Historic England.

== Key ==
Grade	Criteria
I	Buildings that are of exceptional interest
II*	Particularly important buildings of more than special interest
II	Buildings that are of special interest

== Listing ==
Name	Grade	Location	Type	Completed (Note: The date given is the date used by Historic England as significant for the initial building or that of an important part in the structure's description.)	Date designated	Grid ref. (Note: The grid reference is based on the British national grid reference system, sometimes known as OSGB36, used by the Ordnance Survey.) Geo-coordinates	Notes	Entry number (Note: The "List Entry Number" is a unique number assigned to each listed building and scheduled monument by Historic England.)	Image	Wikidata
Forsham Farmhouse	II				9 August 1979	TQ8351129266; 51°02′00″N 0°36′57″E		1362918	Upload Photo	Q26644778
Granary Oasthouses and Stable Block at Halden Place Situated to the East of the House	II				9 August 1979	TQ8496833662; 51°04′21″N 0°38′20″E		1320038	Upload Photo	Q26606080
Halden Place	II				16 August 1962	TQ8502633696; 51°04′22″N 0°38′23″E		1070948	Upload Photo	Q26325601
L Shaped Range of Barns to South West of Halden Place	II				9 August 1979	TQ8506633703; 51°04′22″N 0°38′25″E		1070949	Upload Photo	Q26325603
Oasthouse and Granary at Forsham Farmhouse	II				9 August 1979	TQ8355529304; 51°02′02″N 0°36′59″E		1116261	Upload Photo	Q26409897
Parish Church of St Mary	I				16 August 1962	TQ8450931219; 51°03′02″N 0°37′52″E		1116287	Parish Church of St Mary More images	Q17582904
Rolvenden War Memorial	II				1 August 2000	TQ8447231237; 51°03′03″N 0°37′50″E		1381140	Rolvenden War Memorial More images	Q26661266
Tomb in Churchyard to Edward Walter Forbes	II				9 August 1979	TQ8455031231; 51°03′03″N 0°37′54″E		1070947	Upload Photo	Q26325599
Hole Park	II	Benenden Road			9 August 1979	TQ8321032482; 51°03′45″N 0°36′48″E		1362919	Hole Park More images	Q26644779
Ice House in the Grounds of Hole Park	II	Benenden Road			10 May 2005	TQ8326132650; 51°03′50″N 0°36′50″E		1391382	Upload Photo	Q26670747
Mill House	II	Benenden Road			9 August 1979	TQ8386931527; 51°03′13″N 0°37′20″E		1362920	Upload Photo	Q26644780
Ranters Hall	II	Benenden Road			9 August 1979	TQ8288631946; 51°03′28″N 0°36′30″E		1070951	Upload Photo	Q26325608
Rolvenden Windmill	II*	Benenden Road			16 August 1962	TQ8381531537; 51°03′14″N 0°37′17″E		1116206	Rolvenden Windmill More images	Q7361434
Saxbys	II	Benenden Road			4 June 1952	TQ8403631502; 51°03′12″N 0°37′28″E		1116250	Upload Photo	Q26409888
South East Lodge to Hole Park	II	Benenden Road			9 August 1979	TQ8354531715; 51°03′20″N 0°37′03″E		1070950	Upload Photo	Q26325605
The Garden Cottage at Hole Park	II	Benenden Road			9 August 1979	TQ8312932526; 51°03′46″N 0°36′43″E		1116234	Upload Photo	Q26409874
Windmill Farm Oast	II	Benenden Road			19 October 1995	TQ8407331511; 51°03′12″N 0°37′30″E		1247883	Upload Photo	Q26540148
Freezingham Cottages	II	1-4, Freezingham Lane, Rolvenden Layne			9 August 1979	TQ8550830082; 51°02′25″N 0°38′41″E		1070908	Upload Photo	Q26325514
16 and 18, Frensham Road	II	16 and 18, Frensham Road, Rolvenden Layne			9 August 1979	TQ8534430299; 51°02′32″N 0°38′33″E		1362940	Upload Photo	Q26644801
20-24, Frensham Road	II	20-24, Frensham Road, Rolvenden Layne			2 February 1976	TQ8533530301; 51°02′32″N 0°38′33″E		1070909	Upload Photo	Q26325515
Kingsgate Cottage	II	40, Frensham Road, Rolvenden Layne			9 August 1979	TQ8518630315; 51°02′32″N 0°38′25″E		1362941	Upload Photo	Q26644802
Maytham Bungalows	II	1-6, Frogs Lane, Rolvenden Layne			9 August 1979	TQ8506030192; 51°02′29″N 0°38′18″E		1070910	Upload Photo	Q26325518
Slades Cottage	II	Frogs Lane, Rolvenden Layne			9 August 1979	TQ8407830200; 51°02′30″N 0°37′28″E		1070911	Upload Photo	Q26325521
2, 4 and 6, Hastings Road	II*	2, 4 and 6, Hastings Road			16 August 1962	TQ8447231258; 51°03′04″N 0°37′50″E		1070913	Upload Photo	Q17556080
8-22, Hastings Road	II	8-22, Hastings Road			16 August 1962	TQ8445931223; 51°03′03″N 0°37′49″E		1362944	Upload Photo	Q26644805
Cherry Garden Farmhouse	II	Hastings Road			16 August 1962	TQ8381830303; 51°02′34″N 0°37′15″E		1070915	Upload Photo	Q26325527
Corn Hill	II	Hastings Road			16 August 1962	TQ8401430463; 51°02′39″N 0°37′25″E		1115732	Upload Photo	Q26409427
Great Job's Cross	II	Hastings Road			9 August 1979	TQ8332929790; 51°02′18″N 0°36′49″E		1070916	Upload Photo	Q26325529
Hexden Farmhouse	II	Hastings Road			9 August 1979	TQ8272328875; 51°01′49″N 0°36′16″E		1320288	Upload Photo	Q26606302
Merrington Place	II	Hastings Road			16 August 1962	TQ8403530667; 51°02′45″N 0°37′27″E		1070912	Upload Photo	Q26325522
Oasthouses at Bayard's Oast	II	Hastings Road			9 August 1979	TQ8399530677; 51°02′46″N 0°37′25″E		1362943	Upload Photo	Q26644804
School House	II	9, Hastings Road			16 August 1962	TQ8439931186; 51°03′02″N 0°37′46″E		1362942	Upload Photo	Q26644803
The Old Parsonage	II	24, Hastings Road			16 August 1962	TQ8445031137; 51°03′00″N 0°37′49″E		1115726	Upload Photo	Q26409422
12-18, High Street	II	12-18, High Street			9 August 1979	TQ8442931337; 51°03′06″N 0°37′48″E		1115702	Upload Photo	Q26409400
2 and 4, High Street	II	2 and 4, High Street			9 August 1979	TQ8445831283; 51°03′05″N 0°37′49″E		1070914	Upload Photo	Q26325525
20, High Street	II	20, High Street			9 August 1979	TQ8442231357; 51°03′07″N 0°37′48″E		1070919	Upload Photo	Q26325536
26 and 28, High Street	II	26 and 28, High Street			9 August 1979	TQ8441231385; 51°03′08″N 0°37′47″E		1320308	Upload Photo	Q26606320
32 and 34, High Street	II	32 and 34, High Street			16 August 1962	TQ8440431408; 51°03′09″N 0°37′47″E		1070921	Upload Photo	Q26325541
36-46, High Street	II	36-46, High Street			9 August 1979	TQ8440331428; 51°03′09″N 0°37′47″E		1115683	Upload Photo	Q26409381
39-43, High Street	II	39-43, High Street			16 August 1962	TQ8442731471; 51°03′11″N 0°37′48″E		1115584	Upload Photo	Q26409291
45-55, High Street	II	45-55, High Street			16 August 1962	TQ8442431494; 51°03′11″N 0°37′48″E		1070927	Upload Photo	Q26325555
52 and 54, High Street	II	52 and 54, High Street			16 August 1962	TQ8439631458; 51°03′10″N 0°37′47″E		1070922	Upload Photo	Q26325544
56 and 58, High Street	II	56 and 58, High Street			16 August 1962	TQ8438831477; 51°03′11″N 0°37′46″E		1115661	Upload Photo	Q26409360
57, High Street	II	57, High Street			16 August 1962	TQ8442231508; 51°03′12″N 0°37′48″E		1362908	Upload Photo	Q26644769
59 and 61, High Street	II	59 and 61, High Street			16 August 1962	TQ8442231520; 51°03′12″N 0°37′48″E		1320369	Upload Photo	Q26606373
6, High Street	II	6, High Street			9 August 1979	TQ8445331295; 51°03′05″N 0°37′49″E		1070917	Upload Photo	Q26325532
60 and 62, High Street	II	60 and 62, High Street			16 August 1962	TQ8438331501; 51°03′12″N 0°37′46″E		1362905	Upload Photo	Q26644766
63-73, High Street	II	63-73, High Street			16 August 1962	TQ8442031533; 51°03′13″N 0°37′48″E		1070928	Upload Photo	Q26325558
78, High Street	II	78, High Street			16 August 1962	TQ8438431607; 51°03′15″N 0°37′46″E		1115620	Upload Photo	Q26409321
8, High Street	II	8, High Street			9 August 1979	TQ8444431306; 51°03′05″N 0°37′49″E		1115722	Upload Photo	Q26409418
Chamberlaynes Tweedies	II	High Street			16 August 1962	TQ8440731699; 51°03′18″N 0°37′48″E		1115590	Upload Photo	Q26409296
Conveneys	II	High Street			16 August 1962	TQ8448731748; 51°03′20″N 0°37′52″E		1115597	Upload Photo	Q26409300
Disused Forge Adjoining No 64 to the South	II	High Street			16 August 1962	TQ8438431538; 51°03′13″N 0°37′46″E		1115641	Upload Photo	Q26409340
East House	II	66-72, High Street			16 August 1962	TQ8438631571; 51°03′14″N 0°37′46″E		1070924	Upload Photo	Q26325548
Forge Cottage	II	64, High Street			4 June 1952	TQ8438431551; 51°03′13″N 0°37′46″E		1070923	Upload Photo	Q26325546
Garage Block to Chamberlaynes and Tweedies to West of House	II	High Street			9 August 1979	TQ8437131698; 51°03′18″N 0°37′46″E		1362907	Upload Photo	Q26644768
Kingpost	II*	75, High Street			4 June 1952	TQ8443531581; 51°03′14″N 0°37′49″E		1115555	Upload Photo	Q17556274
Pump Opposite No 60	II	High Street			9 August 1979	TQ8440331508; 51°03′12″N 0°37′47″E		1115635	Upload Photo	Q26409336
Streyte Cottage	II	10, High Street			9 August 1979	TQ8443631316; 51°03′06″N 0°37′48″E		1070918	Upload Photo	Q26325534
The Firs	II	80, High Street			16 August 1962	TQ8439031635; 51°03′16″N 0°37′47″E		1070925	Upload Photo	Q26325550
The Star Public House	II	30, High Street			9 August 1979	TQ8440931396; 51°03′08″N 0°37′47″E		1070920	Upload Photo	Q26325539
Village Pump Opposite No 29	II	High Street			9 August 1979	TQ8442631419; 51°03′09″N 0°37′48″E		1070926	Upload Photo	Q26325553
Woodencote	II	76, High Street			16 August 1962	TQ8438431591; 51°03′15″N 0°37′46″E		1362906	Upload Photo	Q26644767
Oasthouses at Rawlinson Farm	II	Hole Park			9 August 1979	TQ8389832688; 51°03′51″N 0°37′23″E		1115527	Upload Photo	Q26409245
Rawlinson Farmhouse	II*	Hole Park			4 June 1952	TQ8390932650; 51°03′49″N 0°37′24″E		1362909	Upload Photo	Q17556939
Common Garden, Including Boundary and Garden Walls	II	Including Boundary And Garden Walls, 2, Frensham Road			27 April 2010	TQ8545930305; 51°02′32″N 0°38′39″E		1393775	Upload Photo	Q26672918
13 and 15, Maytham Road	II	13 and 15, Maytham Road, Rolvenden Layne			16 August 1962	TQ8534230190; 51°02′28″N 0°38′33″E		1362932	Upload Photo	Q26644793
14, Maytham Road	II	14, Maytham Road, Rolvenden Layne			9 August 1979	TQ8526230269; 51°02′31″N 0°38′29″E		1070891	Upload Photo	Q26325475
3 and 7, Maytham Road	II	3 and 7, Maytham Road, Rolvenden Layne			16 August 1962	TQ8523030230; 51°02′30″N 0°38′27″E		1070888	Upload Photo	Q26325467
32 and 34, Maytham Road	II	32 and 34, Maytham Road, Rolvenden Layne			1 December 1976	TQ8536830216; 51°02′29″N 0°38′34″E		1070892	Upload Photo	Q26325477
36 and 38, Maytham Road	II	36 and 38, Maytham Road, Rolvenden Layne			9 August 1979	TQ8538130209; 51°02′29″N 0°38′35″E		1087081	Upload Photo	Q26379558
4-8, Maytham Road	II	4-8, Maytham Road, Rolvenden Layne			9 August 1979	TQ8522130278; 51°02′31″N 0°38′27″E		1362933	Upload Photo	Q26644794
40, 44 and 46, Maytham Road	II	40, 44 and 46, Maytham Road, Rolvenden Layne			9 August 1979	TQ8539430196; 51°02′28″N 0°38′35″E		1070893	Upload Photo	Q26325480
48, Maytham Road	II	48, Maytham Road, Rolvenden Layne			9 August 1979	TQ8541530170; 51°02′27″N 0°38′36″E		1335829	Upload Photo	Q26620389
9 and 11, Maytham Road	II	9 and 11, Maytham Road, Rolvenden Layne			9 August 1979	TQ8526630223; 51°02′29″N 0°38′29″E		1070889	Upload Photo	Q26325470
Bull Farmhouse	II	Maytham Road			9 August 1979	TQ8481431116; 51°02′59″N 0°38′07″E		1070929	Upload Photo	Q26325560
Corner Stores	II	Maytham Road, Rolvenden Layne			9 August 1979	TQ8540530166; 51°02′27″N 0°38′36″E		1070894	Upload Photo	Q26325482
Former Working Men's Club	II	Maytham Road, TN17 4NE			29 April 1994	TQ8475931059; 51°02′57″N 0°38′04″E		1275664	Upload Photo	Q26565228
Four Went Cottage	II	2, Maytham Road, Rolvenden Layne			9 August 1979	TQ8518030285; 51°02′31″N 0°38′25″E		1070890	Upload Photo	Q26325473
Gatehouse to Great Maytham	II*	Maytham Road			4 June 1952	TQ8489530730; 51°02′46″N 0°38′11″E		1070886	Gatehouse to Great Maytham More images	Q17556078
Great Maytham	II*	Maytham Road			4 June 1952	TQ8481930620; 51°02′43″N 0°38′07″E		1115477	Great Maytham More images	Q5599552
Horton Cottage	II	30, Maytham Road, Rolvenden Layne			1 December 1976	TQ8536430217; 51°02′29″N 0°38′34″E		1087077	Upload Photo	Q26379555
Icehouse in Grounds of Kingsgate	II	Maytham Road			9 August 1979	TQ8524630718; 51°02′45″N 0°38′29″E		1070887	Upload Photo	Q26325465
Kingsgate	II	Maytham Road			9 August 1979	TQ8509630708; 51°02′45″N 0°38′21″E		1362930	Upload Photo	Q26644791
The Limes	II	22 and 24, Maytham Road, Rolvenden Layne			9 August 1979	TQ8530130307; 51°02′32″N 0°38′31″E		1362934	Upload Photo	Q26644795
Wesley House	II	1, Maytham Road, Rolvenden Layne			16 August 1962	TQ8518230244; 51°02′30″N 0°38′25″E		1362931	Upload Photo	Q26644792
Yew Tree House	II	18, Maytham Road, Rolvenden Layne			9 August 1979	TQ8528630255; 51°02′30″N 0°38′30″E		1335833	Upload Photo	Q26620392
Barn at Lower Murgie to South of House	II	Mounts Lane			9 August 1979	TQ8616431272; 51°03′02″N 0°39′17″E		1087048	Upload Photo	Q26379532
Frensham Manor	II	Mounts Lane			4 June 1952	TQ8557130265; 51°02′30″N 0°38′45″E		1070895	Upload Photo	Q26325484
Lower Murgie	II	Mounts Lane			9 August 1979	TQ8615031296; 51°03′03″N 0°39′16″E		1070897	Upload Photo	Q26325489
Mount Cottage	II	Mounts Lane			9 August 1979	TQ8549830468; 51°02′37″N 0°38′41″E		1070896	Upload Photo	Q26325486
Oasthouse at Lower Murgie to North of House	II	Mounts Lane			9 August 1979	TQ8616631328; 51°03′04″N 0°39′17″E		1070898	Upload Photo	Q26325491
Pix's Cottages	II	1, 2 and 3, Mounts Lane			16 August 1962	TQ8538831226; 51°03′02″N 0°38′37″E		1087072	Upload Photo	Q26379551
Winser Farmhouse	II	Mounts Lane			16 August 1962	TQ8559530364; 51°02′34″N 0°38′46″E		1335854	Upload Photo	Q26620410
Outbuilding at Woolwich Farm to East of Farmhouse	II	Pix's Lane			9 August 1979	TQ8533431252; 51°03′03″N 0°38′34″E		1087053	Upload Photo	Q26379537
Woolwich Farmhouse	II	Pix's Lane			9 August 1979	TQ8529931240; 51°03′02″N 0°38′32″E		1070899	Upload Photo	Q26325493
2 and 4, Regent Street	II	2 and 4, Regent Street			9 August 1979	TQ8433531509; 51°03′12″N 0°37′43″E		1087019	Upload Photo	Q26379508
Alma Cottages	II	12-18, Regent Street			9 August 1979	TQ8427931504; 51°03′12″N 0°37′41″E		1087031	Upload Photo	Q26379517
Bull Hotel	II	1, Regent Street			9 August 1979	TQ8436631539; 51°03′13″N 0°37′45″E		1070900	Upload Photo	Q26325496
Crescent Cottage	II	6, Regent Street			16 August 1962	TQ8431131507; 51°03′12″N 0°37′42″E		1070901	Upload Photo	Q26325499
Lime House	II	24, Regent Street			16 August 1962	TQ8425131501; 51°03′12″N 0°37′39″E		1362935	Upload Photo	Q26644796
Barn at Kensham Farm to North of Farmhouse	II	Sandhurst Road			9 August 1979	TQ8247429994; 51°02′25″N 0°36′05″E		1335866	Upload Photo	Q26620418
Davenden Farmhouse	II	Sandhurst Road			9 August 1979	TQ8279330425; 51°02′39″N 0°36′22″E		1087033	Upload Photo	Q26379519
Kensham Farmhouse	II	Sandhurst Road, Kensham Green			9 August 1979	TQ8245529957; 51°02′24″N 0°36′04″E		1070902	Upload Photo	Q26325501
Little Kensham Farmhouse	II	Sandhurst Road, Kensham Green			9 August 1979	TQ8244329676; 51°02′15″N 0°36′03″E		1362936	Upload Photo	Q26644797
Little Halden	II	Tenterden Road			9 August 1979	TQ8539332665; 51°03′48″N 0°38′40″E		1362937	Upload Photo	Q26644798
Oasthouse and Granary at Little Halden	II	Tenterden Road			9 August 1979	TQ8537032634; 51°03′47″N 0°38′39″E		1086961	Upload Photo	Q26379428
Stillwaters	II	Tenterden Road			9 August 1979	TQ8491031912; 51°03′24″N 0°38′14″E		1070903	Upload Photo	Q26325503
Strood House	II	Tenterden Road			16 August 1962	TQ8556832062; 51°03′28″N 0°38′48″E		1086959	Upload Photo	Q26379419
K6 Telephone Kiosk	II	The Street			20 February 1989	TQ8442431435; 51°03′10″N 0°37′48″E		1275637	Upload Photo	Q26565204
1, Thornden Lane	II	1, Thornden Lane, Rolvenden Layne			9 August 1979	TQ8537430127; 51°02′26″N 0°38′34″E		1070904	Upload Photo	Q26325507
3, Thornden Lane	II	3, Thornden Lane, Rolvenden Layne			9 August 1979	TQ8536530116; 51°02′26″N 0°38′34″E		1086966	Upload Photo	Q26379443
Barnshill Cottage	II	Thornden Lane, Rolvenden Layne, Cranbrook, TN17 4PR			9 August 1979	TQ8535530109; 51°02′26″N 0°38′33″E		1070905	Upload Photo	Q26325509
Oasthouse Approximately 20 Metres North East of Thornden Farmhouse	II	Thornden Lane, Rolvenden Layne			9 August 1979	TQ8507929839; 51°02′17″N 0°38′19″E		1362938	Upload Photo	Q26644799
Thornden Farmhouse	II	Thornden Lane, Rolvenden Layne			16 August 1962	TQ8505729817; 51°02′16″N 0°38′17″E		1086973	Upload Photo	Q26379457
Witherden House	II	West Cross			9 August 1979	TQ8353831655; 51°03′18″N 0°37′03″E		1086941	Upload Photo	Q26379342
3-7, Windser Road	II	3-7, Windser Road, Rolvenden Layne			9 August 1979	TQ8542630196; 51°02′28″N 0°38′37″E		1362939	Upload Photo	Q26644800
9, Windser Road	II	9, Windser Road, Rolvenden Layne			9 August 1979	TQ8542830215; 51°02′29″N 0°38′37″E		1086948	Upload Photo	Q26379367
11-29, Winser Road	II	11-29, Winser Road, TN17 4NL, Rolvenden Layne			9 August 1979	TQ8543830241; 51°02′30″N 0°38′38″E		1070907	Upload Photo	Q26325511
Barge Cottage	II	Wittersham Road			9 August 1979	TQ8682227965; 51°01′15″N 0°39′45″E		1070865	Upload Photo	Q26325414
Hillgate	II	Wittersham Road			9 August 1979	TQ8587629702; 51°02′12″N 0°38′59″E		1070863	Upload Photo	Q26325408
Lowden Farmhouse	II	Wittersham Road			9 August 1979	TQ8548729614; 51°02′09″N 0°38′39″E		1086951	Upload Photo	Q26379381
Maytham Farmhouse	II	Wittersham Road			9 August 1979	TQ8659328432; 51°01′30″N 0°39′34″E		1362958	Upload Photo	Q26644818
Oasthouse at Hillgate	II	Wittersham Road			9 August 1979	TQ8593129682; 51°02′11″N 0°39′02″E		1070864	Upload Photo	Q26325412

== See also ==
- Grade I listed buildings in Kent
- Grade II* listed buildings in Kent

== Sources ==
- Newman, John (2012) [1969], Kent: West and the Weald, The Buildings of England, New Haven and London: Yale University Press, ISBN 978-0-300-18509-6
