= Listed buildings in Pluckley =

Historic structures in Kent, England

Pluckley is a village and civil parish in the Borough of Ashford of Kent, England. It contains one grade I, four grade II* and 68 grade II listed buildings that are recorded in the National Heritage List for England.

This list is based on the information retrieved online from Historic England

== Key ==
Grade	Criteria
I	Buildings that are of exceptional interest
II*	Particularly important buildings of more than special interest
II	Buildings that are of special interest

== Listing ==
Name	Grade	Location	Type	Completed (Note: The date given is the date used by Historic England as significant for the initial building or that of an important part in the structure's description.)	Date designated	Grid ref. (Note: The grid reference is based on the British national grid reference system, sometimes known as OSGB36, used by the Ordnance Survey.) Geo-coordinates	Notes	Entry number (Note: The "List Entry Number" is a unique number assigned to each listed building and scheduled monument by Historic England.)	Image	Wikidata
Former Granary	II	Attached Wall And Gate Pier To Se Of Ragstone Barn, Pevington Farm, Egerton Road			10 April 2008	TQ9188146450; 51°11′06″N 0°44′39″E		1392524	Upload Photo	Q26671741
Pigsties	II	Attached Wall And Gate Pier To Sw Of Ragstone Barn, Pevington Farm, Egerton Road			10 April 2008	TQ9185646448; 51°11′06″N 0°44′38″E		1392523	Upload Photo	Q26671740
Cooper Farmhouse	II*	Chambers Green Road			14 February 1967	TQ9151743948; 51°09′46″N 0°44′16″E		1145835	Upload Photo	Q17556324
Jennings' Farm Cottages	II	Charing Road			10 October 1980	TQ9313446093; 51°10′53″N 0°45′43″E		1145853	Upload Photo	Q26439001
Jennings Farmhouse	II	Charing Road			14 February 1967	TQ9315145993; 51°10′50″N 0°45′44″E		1071447	Upload Photo	Q26326611
Dowle Street Cottages	II*	Dowle Street Road			14 February 1967	TQ9357243757; 51°09′37″N 0°46′01″E		1318895	Upload Photo	Q17556866
Dowle Street Farmhouse	II	Dowle Street Road			14 February 1967	TQ9361943788; 51°09′38″N 0°46′03″E		1362660	Upload Photo	Q26644535
Saracen's Cottage	II	Dowle Street Road			10 October 1980	TQ9386544361; 51°09′56″N 0°46′17″E		1071448	Upload Photo	Q26326613
Barn Immediately South West of Pivington Farm Cottages (nos 1 and 2)	II	Egerton Road			10 October 1980	TQ9187446421; 51°11′05″N 0°44′39″E		1071412	Upload Photo	Q26326561
Farm Building to East of Pevington Farmhouse	II	Egerton Road			10 April 2008	TQ9184946424; 51°11′05″N 0°44′38″E		1392525	Upload Photo	Q26671742
Granary/dovecote to East of Pivington Manor	II	Egerton Road			10 October 1980	TQ9182746450; 51°11′06″N 0°44′36″E		1071413	Upload Photo	Q26326562
Munday Farmhouse	II	Egerton Road			10 October 1980	TQ9256845799; 51°10′44″N 0°45′13″E		1071449	Upload Photo	Q26326614
Oasthouse to North of Munday Farmhouse	II	Egerton Road			10 October 1980	TQ9256145834; 51°10′45″N 0°45′13″E		1145857	Upload Photo	Q26439006
Old Kingsland Cottage	II	Egerton Road, TN27 0PD			14 February 1967	TQ9243745850; 51°10′46″N 0°45′07″E		1362661	Upload Photo	Q26644536
Pivington Manor	II	Egerton Road			14 February 1967	TQ9179146437; 51°11′06″N 0°44′35″E		1071411	Upload Photo	Q26326559
Pivington Farm Cottages	II	1 and 2, Egerton Road			10 October 1980	TQ9192846439; 51°11′06″N 0°44′42″E		1071414	Upload Photo	Q26326564
Prebbles Hill Cottages	II	1, Egerton Road			10 October 1980	TQ9217645971; 51°10′50″N 0°44′53″E		1145863	Upload Photo	Q26439014
Prebbles Hill Cottages	II	2, Egerton Road			10 October 1980	TQ9212546080; 51°10′54″N 0°44′51″E		1071409	Upload Photo	Q26326557
Prebbles Hill Cottages	II	3, Egerton Road			10 October 1980	TQ9217046041; 51°10′53″N 0°44′53″E		1071410	Upload Photo	Q26326558
Elvy	II	Elvey Farm Road			10 October 1980	TQ9152745800; 51°10′46″N 0°44′20″E		1362679	Upload Photo	Q26644553
Cliffe Cottage	II	Forge Hill			10 October 1980	TQ9251345368; 51°10′30″N 0°45′10″E		1071415	Upload Photo	Q26326565
Coopers Cottage	II	Forge Hill			10 October 1980	TQ9252645399; 51°10′31″N 0°45′10″E		1362680	Upload Photo	Q26644554
Forge Cottage	II	Forge Hill, TN27 0SJ			14 February 1967	TQ9252045328; 51°10′29″N 0°45′10″E		1071416	Upload Photo	Q26326567
Forge Hill House	II	Forge Hill			10 October 1980	TQ9250145335; 51°10′29″N 0°45′09″E		1071417	Upload Photo	Q26326568
The Old Forge	II	Forge Hill, TN27 0SJ			10 October 1980	TQ9252045312; 51°10′29″N 0°45′10″E		1186769	Upload Photo	Q26482005
Ragstone Barn at Pevington Farm	II	Including Attached Cart Shed To South West And Farm Building To East, Egerton Road			10 April 2008	TQ9185546470; 51°11′07″N 0°44′38″E		1392522	Upload Photo	Q26671739
Lambden Cottage	II	Lambden Road, Pluckley Thorne			10 October 1980	TQ9195044675; 51°10′09″N 0°44′39″E		1186773	Upload Photo	Q26482009
Lambden House	II	Lambden Road, Pluckley Thorn, Pluckley Thorne			10 October 1980	TQ9210944594; 51°10′06″N 0°44′47″E		1071418	Upload Photo	Q26326570
Snagsmount	II	Lambden Road			10 October 1980	TQ9223644560; 51°10′05″N 0°44′54″E		1186775	Upload Photo	Q26482011
West Cottage	II	Lambden Road, Pluckley Thorne			10 October 1980	TQ9205244608; 51°10′06″N 0°44′44″E		1362681	Upload Photo	Q26644555
Gore Court	II*	Malmains Road			14 February 1967	TQ9336644028; 51°09′46″N 0°45′51″E		1087078	Upload Photo	Q17556262
Malmains	II	Malmains Road			14 February 1967	TQ9310044551; 51°10′03″N 0°45′38″E		1335822	Upload Photo	Q26620383
1 & 2 Mill Pond Cottages	II	1 & 2 Mill Pond Cottages, TN27 0SB			27 November 2019	TQ9302644331; 51°09′56″N 0°45′34″E		1466560	Upload Photo	Q97386350
Tollgate House	II	Shipland Corner			14 February 1967	TQ9274645609; 51°10′38″N 0°45′22″E		1335823	Upload Photo	Q26620384
Bow Cottage	II	Smarden Road, TN27 0RE			10 October 1980	TQ9169244603; 51°10′07″N 0°44′26″E		1086987	Upload Photo	Q26379480
Luckhurst House	II	Smarden Road, Pluckley Thorne			10 October 1980	TQ9203544890; 51°10′16″N 0°44′44″E		1362685	Upload Photo	Q26644559
Rose Farmhouse	II	Smarden Road			10 October 1980	TQ9132944367; 51°10′00″N 0°44′07″E		1071425	Upload Photo	Q26326580
The Oast House	II	Smarden Road, TN27 0RE			10 October 1980	TQ9169344616; 51°10′07″N 0°44′26″E		1362686	Upload Photo	Q26644560
The Pinnock	II	Smarden Road			10 October 1980	TQ9134144672; 51°10′09″N 0°44′08″E		1086985	Upload Photo	Q26379475
Thorne House	II	Smarden Road, Pluckley Thorne			10 October 1980	TQ9185844787; 51°10′12″N 0°44′35″E		1086983	Upload Photo	Q26379472
Thorne Manor	II	Smarden Road, TN27 0RE			10 October 1980	TQ9171644610; 51°10′07″N 0°44′27″E		1071424	Upload Photo	Q26326579
Forest Gate	II	Station Road			10 October 1980	TQ9213943002; 51°09′14″N 0°44′46″E		1086993	Upload Photo	Q26379487
New House Farmhouse	II	Station Road			10 October 1980	TQ9169042915; 51°09′12″N 0°44′23″E		1071427	Upload Photo	Q26326583
Ragstone	II	Station Road			14 February 1967	TQ9183043068; 51°09′17″N 0°44′30″E		1086958	Upload Photo	Q26379415
Rose Court	II	Station Road			10 October 1980	TQ9260044637; 51°10′07″N 0°45′13″E		1086989	Upload Photo	Q26379482
Stanford Bridge Farmhouse	II	Station Road			10 October 1980	TQ9220342707; 51°09′05″N 0°44′49″E		1362687	Upload Photo	Q26644561
The Dering Arms Inn	II	Station Road			10 October 1980	TQ9217343390; 51°09′27″N 0°44′48″E		1071426	Upload Photo	Q26326582
Gate Lodge to Former Surrenden Dering	II	About 250 Metres South West Of Surrenden House, Surrenden Park			10 October 1980	TQ9368445114; 51°10′21″N 0°46′09″E		1071390	Upload Photo	Q26326530
Surrenden Farmhouse	II	Surrenden Park			10 October 1980	TQ9377045282; 51°10′26″N 0°46′14″E		1071393	Upload Photo	Q26326535
Surrenden House	II	Surrenden Park			14 February 1967	TQ9385445258; 51°10′25″N 0°46′18″E		1071391	Upload Photo	Q26326531
Surrenden Dering	II	1, 2 and 4, Surrenden Park			14 February 1967	TQ9385545307; 51°10′27″N 0°46′19″E		1071392	Upload Photo	Q26326533
Garden Cottage	II	Swan Lane			10 October 1980	TQ9363045510; 51°10′34″N 0°46′07″E		1362682	Upload Photo	Q26644556
Garden Wall to Garden Cottage	II	Swan Lane			10 October 1980	TQ9360245557; 51°10′35″N 0°46′06″E		1087103	Upload Photo	Q26379577
Granary and Oasthouse to the South-west of Sheerland Farmhouse	II*	Swan Lane, TN27 0PN			14 February 1967	TQ9335045456; 51°10′32″N 0°45′53″E		1335838	Upload Photo	Q17556880
Sheerland Farmhouse	II	Swan Lane, TN27 0PN			10 October 1980	TQ9338245508; 51°10′34″N 0°45′55″E		1362683	Upload Photo	Q26644557
Sheerland House	II	Swan Lane, TN27 0PN			10 October 1980	TQ9331145352; 51°10′29″N 0°45′51″E		1071419	Upload Photo	Q26326571
Stables to the North East of Sheerland House	II	Swan Lane, TN27 0PN			10 October 1980	TQ9333745381; 51°10′30″N 0°45′52″E		1071420	Upload Photo	Q26326573
Stone Barn to the East of Sheerland House	II	Swan Lane, TN27 0PN			10 October 1980	TQ9336345367; 51°10′29″N 0°45′53″E		1335836	Upload Photo	Q26620394
Giles Farm Oast	II	The Pinnock, TN27 0SY			10 October 1980	TQ9069144786; 51°10′14″N 0°43′35″E		1087083	Upload Photo	Q26379560
Giles Farmhouse	II	The Pinnock			10 October 1980	TQ9071744781; 51°10′14″N 0°43′36″E		1362684	Upload Photo	Q26644558
Pinnock Farm Cottage	II	The Pinnock			17 September 1997	TQ9136944674; 51°10′09″N 0°44′09″E		1072618	Upload Photo	Q26328373
Church Gates Cottage	II	The Street			10 October 1980	TQ9263545369; 51°10′30″N 0°45′16″E		1335886	Upload Photo	Q26620435
Church of St Nicholas	I	The Street			14 February 1967	TQ9266945351; 51°10′30″N 0°45′18″E		1362688	Upload Photo	Q17529447
Corner House and Church Gates	II	The Street			10 October 1980	TQ9263145382; 51°10′31″N 0°45′16″E		1071428	Upload Photo	Q26326584
Fir Tree Cottage	II	The Street			10 October 1980	TQ9264345308; 51°10′28″N 0°45′16″E		1071389	Upload Photo	Q26326528
Pluckley Church of England Primary School	II	The Street			10 October 1980	TQ9258245357; 51°10′30″N 0°45′13″E		1071429	Upload Photo	Q26326586
The Black Horse Inn	II	The Street			17 September 1952	TQ9259645415; 51°10′32″N 0°45′14″E		1335888	Upload Photo	Q26620437
The Butchers Shop and Street House	II	The Street, TN27 0QS			14 February 1967	TQ9257745383; 51°10′31″N 0°45′13″E		1335891	Upload Photo	Q26620440
The Old Bakery	II	The Street			29 June 1973	TQ9256545405; 51°10′32″N 0°45′12″E		1362650	Upload Photo	Q26644525
Yew Tree Cottage	II	1-4, The Street			14 February 1967	TQ9260745336; 51°10′29″N 0°45′14″E		1071388	Upload Photo	Q26326527
Frith Farmhouse	II				10 October 1980	TQ9064744863; 51°10′16″N 0°43′33″E		1071422	Upload Photo	Q26326576
Gate Lodge to Former Surrenden Dering	II	300 Metres To South East Of Church Of St Nicholas			10 October 1980	TQ9272345259; 51°10′27″N 0°45′20″E		1071423	Upload Photo	Q26326577
Malmains Cottage	II	TN27 0SD			10 October 1980	TQ9294244309; 51°09′56″N 0°45′30″E		1071421	Upload Photo	Q26326574

== See also ==
- Grade I listed buildings in Kent
- Grade II* listed buildings in Kent

== Sources ==
- Newman, John (2012) [1969], Kent: West and the Weald, The Buildings of England, New Haven and London: Yale University Press, ISBN 978-0-300-18509-6
