= Listed buildings in Brook, Kent =

Civil Parish in Kent, England

Brook is a village and civil parish in the Borough of Ashford of Kent, England. It contains two grade I, four grade II* and 17 grade II listed buildings that are recorded in the National Heritage List for England.

This list is based on the information retrieved online from Historic England

== Key ==
Grade	Criteria
I	Buildings that are of exceptional interest
II*	Particularly important buildings of more than special interest
II	Buildings that are of special interest

== Listing ==
Name	Grade	Location	Type	Completed (Note: The date given is the date used by Historic England as significant for the initial building or that of an important part in the structure's description.)	Date designated	Grid ref. (Note: The grid reference is based on the British national grid reference system, sometimes known as OSGB36, used by the Ordnance Survey.) Geo-coordinates	Notes	Entry number (Note: The "List Entry Number" is a unique number assigned to each listed building and scheduled monument by Historic England.)	Image	Wikidata
Troy Town Farmhouse	II				16 February 1989	TR0710844332; 51°09′39″N 0°57′38″E		1276827	Upload Photo	Q26566311
Elm Cottage and Bakehouse Attached	II	Naccolt Road			16 February 1989	TR0562343118; 51°09′01″N 0°56′19″E		1232928	Upload Photo	Q26526427
Westdown Cottage	II	Nat's Lane			16 February 1989	TR0619644172; 51°09′35″N 0°56′51″E		1232963	Upload Photo	Q26526458
Barn About 20 Metres West	II*	Plumpton Lane			27 November 1957	TR0650342339; 51°08′35″N 0°57′03″E		1232968	Upload Photo	Q17556537
Brabourne End	II	Plumpton Lane			16 February 1989	TR0677842377; 51°08′36″N 0°57′17″E		1232930	Upload Photo	Q26526429
Naccolt Farmhouse and Walls Attached	II	Plumpton Lane			27 November 1957	TR0653742352; 51°08′35″N 0°57′05″E		1232967	Upload Photo	Q26526462
Peartree Farmhouse	II	Plumpton Lane			16 February 1989	TR0632042340; 51°08′35″N 0°56′54″E		1232931	Upload Photo	Q26526430
Plumpton Farmhouse and Garden Walls	II	Plumpton Lane			27 November 1957	TR0547842906; 51°08′55″N 0°56′11″E		1276824	Upload Photo	Q26566309
Forstal Farmhouse	II*	Spelders Hill			27 November 1957	TR0623644003; 51°09′29″N 0°56′53″E		1232970	Upload Photo	Q17556567
Spelders Hill Farmhouse	II	Spelders Hill			16 February 1989	TR0622743863; 51°09′25″N 0°56′52″E		1232969	Upload Photo	Q26526463
Barn with Sheds About 50 Metres West of Court Lodge	I	The Street			16 February 1989	TR0657544265; 51°09′37″N 0°57′11″E		1233070	Barn with Sheds About 50 Metres West of Court Lodge More images	Q17529395
Brook House	II	The Street			16 February 1989	TR0671844533; 51°09′46″N 0°57′19″E		1233129	Upload Photo	Q26526612
Church of St Mary	I	The Street			27 November 1957	TR0663544281; 51°09′38″N 0°57′14″E		1232974	Church of St Mary More images	Q17529379
Court Lodge	II*	The Street			27 November 1957	TR0663344231; 51°09′36″N 0°57′14″E		1276825	Upload Photo	Q17556845
Forge Building, About 30 Metres East of Brook House	II	About 30 Metres East Of Brook House, The Street			16 February 1989	TR0674544532; 51°09′46″N 0°57′20″E		1232976	Upload Photo	Q26526468
Oasthouse About 30 Metres West of Court Lodge	II	The Street			16 February 1989	TR0657744224; 51°09′36″N 0°57′11″E		1232975	Upload Photo	Q26526467
Old Coachhouse About 15 Metres West of the Honest Miller	II	The Street			27 November 1957	TR0686544641; 51°09′49″N 0°57′26″E		1232973	Upload Photo	Q26526466
Primrose Cottage	II	The Street			16 February 1989	TR0677244588; 51°09′47″N 0°57′21″E		1233159	Upload Photo	Q26526641
The Honest Miller	II	The Street			27 November 1957	TR0688444635; 51°09′49″N 0°57′27″E		1232972	The Honest Miller More images	Q26526465
Wexford Cottage	II	The Street			16 February 1989	TR0701644762; 51°09′53″N 0°57′34″E		1232971	Upload Photo	Q26526464
Yew Tree House	II	The Street			16 February 1989	TR0668444496; 51°09′45″N 0°57′17″E		1276826	Upload Photo	Q26566310
Garden Cottage	II	Troy Town			16 February 1989	TR0713844312; 51°09′38″N 0°57′40″E		1233167	Upload Photo	Q26526648
Troy Town House and Wall	II*	Troy Town			15 March 1988	TR0711244354; 51°09′39″N 0°57′38″E		1232977	Upload Photo	Q17556594

== See also ==
- Grade I listed buildings in Kent
- Grade II* listed buildings in Kent

== Sources ==
- Newman, John (2012) [1969], Kent: West and the Weald, The Buildings of England, New Haven and London: Yale University Press, ISBN 978-0-300-18509-6
