= Listed buildings in Smarden =

Civil Parish in Kent, England

Smarden is a village and civil parish in the Borough of Ashford of Kent, England. It contains one grade I, eight grade II* and 121 grade II listed buildings that are recorded in the National Heritage List for England.

This list is based on the information retrieved online from Historic England

== Key ==
Grade	Criteria
I	Buildings that are of exceptional interest
II*	Particularly important buildings of more than special interest
II	Buildings that are of special interest

== Listing ==
Name	Grade	Location	Type	Completed (Note: The date given is the date used by Historic England as significant for the initial building or that of an important part in the structure's description.)	Date designated	Grid ref. (Note: Sometimes known as OSGB36, the grid reference is based on the British national grid reference system used by the Ordnance Survey.) Geo-coordinates	Notes	Entry number (Note: The "List Entry Number" is a unique number assigned to each listed building and scheduled monument by Historic England.)	Image	Wikidata
Malthouse Farmhouse	II	Bedlam Lane			14 February 1967	TQ8718044176; 51°09′58″N 0°40′33″E		1104838	Upload Photo	Q26398804
Oasthouse to North West of Malthouse Farmhouse	II	Bedlam Lane			10 October 1980	TQ8715444194; 51°09′59″N 0°40′32″E		1362674	Upload Photo	Q26644548
Swift's Green Farmhouse	II	Bedlam Lane			10 October 1980	TQ8701344504; 51°10′09″N 0°40′25″E		1332950	Upload Photo	Q26617731
Barnden	II	Bell Lane			10 October 1980	TQ8606741930; 51°08′47″N 0°39′32″E		1071404	Upload Photo	Q26326550
Church Farmhouse	II	Bell Lane			10 October 1980	TQ8696042860; 51°09′16″N 0°40′19″E		1332951	Upload Photo	Q26617732
Hadman's Bridge	II	Bell Lane			14 February 1967	TQ8659542471; 51°09′04″N 0°40′00″E		1362675	Upload Photo	Q26644549
Hadman's Place Farmhouse	II	Bell Lane			14 February 1967	TQ8665542635; 51°09′09″N 0°40′03″E		1071403	Upload Photo	Q26326549
Oast Cottage	II	Bell Lane			10 October 1980	TQ8608441897; 51°08′46″N 0°39′32″E		1362676	Upload Photo	Q26644550
Oasthouse to North of Hadman's Place Farmhouse	II	Bell Lane			10 October 1980	TQ8664942673; 51°09′10″N 0°40′03″E		1332953	Upload Photo	Q26617734
Obeden	II	Bell Lane			10 October 1980	TQ8634141941; 51°08′47″N 0°39′46″E		1104846	Upload Photo	Q26398813
Weatherboarded Barn to South West of Barnden	II	Bell Lane			10 October 1980	TQ8605941901; 51°08′46″N 0°39′31″E		1104847	Upload Photo	Q26398814
Bell Farmhouse	II	Bell Road, Smarden Bell			10 October 1980	TQ8688243029; 51°09′22″N 0°40′16″E		1326258	Upload Photo	Q26611753
Marley Farmhouse	II	Bell Road			17 September 1952	TQ8627443514; 51°09′38″N 0°39′45″E		1362677	Upload Photo	Q26644551
Munk's Cottage	II	Bell Road			10 October 1980	TQ8666143249; 51°09′29″N 0°40′05″E		1071405	Upload Photo	Q26326551
Munk's Farmhouse	II	Bell Road			10 October 1980	TQ8644243293; 51°09′31″N 0°39′53″E		1325984	Upload Photo	Q26611494
The Old Village Lock Up to the South West of Munk's Farmhouse	II	Bell Road			10 October 1980	TQ8643243299; 51°09′31″N 0°39′53″E		1071406	Upload Photo	Q26326553
Watch House	II	Bell Road			17 September 1952	TQ8646243522; 51°09′38″N 0°39′55″E		1106234	Upload Photo	Q26400116
Blinks Farmhouse	II	Bethersden Road, Haffenden Quarter			14 February 1967	TQ8831140918; 51°08′12″N 0°41′25″E		1071372	Upload Photo	Q26326503
Dreenagh Cottage	II	Bethersden Road			14 February 1967	TQ8791241778; 51°08′40″N 0°41′06″E		1106374	Upload Photo	Q26400242
Fleet Farm Oast	II	Bethersden Road, TN27 8QF			10 October 1980	TQ8804941658; 51°08′36″N 0°41′13″E		1071367	Upload Photo	Q26326496
Fleet Farmhouse	II	Bethersden Road			14 February 1967	TQ8800641680; 51°08′37″N 0°41′11″E		1071408	Upload Photo	Q26326555
Granary to South West of Hamden Grange	II	Bethersden Road			10 October 1980	TQ8912940678; 51°08′03″N 0°42′07″E		1071369	Upload Photo	Q26326498
Haffenden Quarter	II	Bethersden Road, Haffenden Quarter			14 February 1967	TQ8820540935; 51°08′12″N 0°41′20″E		1071371	Upload Photo	Q26326501
Hamden Grange	II*	Bethersden Road			17 September 1952	TQ8914340715; 51°08′04″N 0°42′08″E		1071368	Upload Photo	Q17556212
Hamden Grange Farmhouse	II	Bethersden Road			10 October 1980	TQ8908240790; 51°08′07″N 0°42′05″E		1071370	Upload Photo	Q26326500
Langley	II	Bethersden Road			10 October 1980	TQ8912340509; 51°07′57″N 0°42′06″E		1362695	Upload Photo	Q26644568
Vine Cottage	II	Bethersden Road			10 October 1980	TQ8797641723; 51°08′38″N 0°41′09″E		1325934	Upload Photo	Q26611452
Walford House	II	Bethersden Road			14 February 1967	TQ8783541892; 51°08′44″N 0°41′02″E		1071407	Upload Photo	Q26326554
Bardleden Manor	II	Biddenden Road, TN27 8QG			14 February 1967	TQ8753041796; 51°08′41″N 0°40′47″E		1071374	Upload Photo	Q26326506
Grigsby Farmhouse	II	Biddenden Road			10 October 1980	TQ8731241724; 51°08′39″N 0°40′35″E		1325958	Upload Photo	Q26611472
Luckhurst	II	Biddenden Road, Haffenden Quarter			10 October 1980	TQ8815941214; 51°08′21″N 0°41′18″E		1071375	Upload Photo	Q26326508
Owlcroft	II	Biddenden Road			10 October 1980	TQ8774341885; 51°08′44″N 0°40′58″E		1362696	Upload Photo	Q26644569
Regency Cottage	II	Biddenden Road			10 October 1980	TQ8779441867; 51°08′43″N 0°41′00″E		1071373	Upload Photo	Q26326504
Thorn Farmhouse	II	Biddenden Road			14 February 1967	TQ8726541696; 51°08′38″N 0°40′33″E		1362697	Upload Photo	Q26644570
Apple Tree Cottage	II	Cage Lane			10 October 1980	TQ8777841925; 51°08′45″N 0°41′00″E		1071378	Upload Photo	Q26326512
Cage Lane Cottage	II	Cage Lane			10 October 1980	TQ8802042281; 51°08′56″N 0°41′13″E		1071376	Upload Photo	Q26326509
Cherry Tree House	II	Cage Lane, TN27 8QD			10 October 1980	TQ8806442289; 51°08′56″N 0°41′15″E		1106344	Upload Photo	Q26400213
Mill House	II	Cage Lane			10 October 1980	TQ8781741996; 51°08′47″N 0°41′02″E		1071377	Upload Photo	Q26326510
Remains of Windmill in Grounds of Mill House	II	Cage Lane			17 September 1952	TQ8782941986; 51°08′47″N 0°41′02″E		1325977	Upload Photo	Q26611487
River Cottage	II	Cage Lane			10 October 1980	TQ8796942235; 51°08′55″N 0°41′10″E		1325960	Upload Photo	Q26611474
The Thatched House	II*	Cage Lane			14 February 1967	TQ8782242092; 51°08′50″N 0°41′02″E		1106331	Upload Photo	Q17556267
Town Bridge Cottage	II	Cage Lane			10 October 1980	TQ8796542221; 51°08′54″N 0°41′10″E		1362698	Upload Photo	Q26644571
K6 Telephone Kiosk	II	High Street			7 July 1989	TQ8810942347; 51°08′58″N 0°41′17″E		1362746	Upload Photo	Q26644616
Biddenden Green Farmhouse	II*	Lewd Lane			14 February 1967	TQ8878142867; 51°09′14″N 0°41′53″E		1362699	Upload Photo	Q17556897
Little Biddenden Green	II	Lewd Lane, Little Biddenden			10 October 1980	TQ8865343053; 51°09′20″N 0°41′47″E		1106286	Upload Photo	Q26400163
The Thatched Barn	II	Lewd Lane, TN27 8NJ			10 October 1980	TQ8880842851; 51°09′14″N 0°41′54″E		1071379	Upload Photo	Q26326513
The White Cottage	II	Lewd Lane, Little Biddenden			10 October 1980	TQ8873642965; 51°09′17″N 0°41′51″E		1362700	Upload Photo	Q26644572
Ash Farmhouse	II	Mill Lane			17 September 1952	TQ8760442830; 51°09′14″N 0°40′52″E		1071380	Upload Photo	Q26326515
Barn to South West of Ash Farmhouse	II	Mill Lane			10 October 1980	TQ8758942808; 51°09′14″N 0°40′52″E		1071381	Upload Photo	Q26326516
Little Ash	II	Mill Lane			10 October 1980	TQ8774542854; 51°09′15″N 0°41′00″E		1107201	Upload Photo	Q26401011
Remains of the Pound to South of Ash Farmhouse	II	Mill Lane			10 October 1980	TQ8760642818; 51°09′14″N 0°40′52″E		1106290	Upload Photo	Q26400167
Berries Maple Cottage	II	Pluckley Road			10 October 1980	TQ8870642743; 51°09′10″N 0°41′49″E		1362701	Upload Photo	Q26644573
Bull Lane Cottage	II	Pluckley Road			10 October 1980	TQ8903043227; 51°09′25″N 0°42′06″E		1362703	Upload Photo	Q26644575
Dering Farmhouse	II	Pluckley Road			10 October 1980	TQ8926042903; 51°09′15″N 0°42′18″E		1325169	Upload Photo	Q26610750
Halfways	II	Pluckley Road			10 October 1980	TQ8894142895; 51°09′15″N 0°42′01″E		1107179	Upload Photo	Q26400991
Hodge Farm Cottages	II	Pluckley Road			14 February 1967	TQ9033143162; 51°09′22″N 0°43′13″E		1071386	Upload Photo	Q26326524
Jubilee House	II	Pluckley Road			14 February 1967	TQ8848442491; 51°09′02″N 0°41′37″E		1362702	Upload Photo	Q26644574
Maltman's Hill Farmhouse	II	Pluckley Road, Maltman's Hill			14 February 1967	TQ9036943152; 51°09′21″N 0°43′15″E		1107937	Upload Photo	Q26401728
Maltman's Hill House	II	Pluckley Road, Maltman's Hill			14 February 1967	TQ9035843224; 51°09′24″N 0°43′15″E		1362704	Upload Photo	Q26644576
Newenden House	II	Pluckley Road			10 October 1980	TQ8919542970; 51°09′17″N 0°42′14″E		1071384	Upload Photo	Q26326521
Pearson Farmhouse	II	Pluckley Road			10 October 1980	TQ8938042935; 51°09′16″N 0°42′24″E		1071385	Upload Photo	Q26326523
Squirrel Cottage	II	Pluckley Road			10 October 1980	TQ8859642642; 51°09′07″N 0°41′43″E		1071382	Upload Photo	Q26326518
Stanley House	II	Pluckley Road			10 October 1980	TQ8863842595; 51°09′05″N 0°41′45″E		1107171	Upload Photo	Q26400982
The Oast House	II	Pluckley Road, TN27 8NQ			10 October 1980	TQ8878442836; 51°09′13″N 0°41′53″E		1106309	Upload Photo	Q26400183
Tolhurst Farmhouse	II	Pluckley Road			10 October 1980	TQ8945542928; 51°09′15″N 0°42′28″E		1107930	Upload Photo	Q26401719
Wallington House	II	Pluckley Road			10 October 1980	TQ8865442721; 51°09′10″N 0°41′46″E		1107206	Upload Photo	Q26401017
Baker's Bridge Cottages	II	1 and 2, Pluckley Road			10 October 1980	TQ8893042883; 51°09′14″N 0°42′01″E		1071383	Upload Photo	Q26326519
Buckman Green Farmhouse	II	Romden Road			14 February 1967	TQ8877841651; 51°08′35″N 0°41′51″E		1362723	Upload Photo	Q26644594
Crowbridge Cottage	II	Romden Road			2 February 2015	TQ8998942451; 51°08′59″N 0°42′54″E		1423264	Upload Photo	Q26676995
Dawkins	II	Romden Road			14 February 1967	TQ9012242675; 51°09′06″N 0°43′02″E		1107941	Upload Photo	Q26401731
Mainey Wood	II	Romden Road			14 February 1967	TQ9020942692; 51°09′07″N 0°43′06″E		1362705	Upload Photo	Q26644577
Romden	II	Romden Road			14 February 1967	TQ8950742140; 51°08′50″N 0°42′29″E		1071348	Upload Photo	Q26326474
Romden Barn	II	Romden Road, TN27 8RA			10 October 1980	TQ8949142087; 51°08′48″N 0°42′28″E		1071350	Upload Photo	Q26326475
Romden Castle	II	Romden Road			17 September 1952	TQ8966342104; 51°08′48″N 0°42′37″E		1071387	Upload Photo	Q26326525
Romden Cottage	II	Romden Road			10 October 1980	TQ8971542153; 51°08′50″N 0°42′40″E		1071346	Upload Photo	Q26326470
Snapmill Farmhouse	II	Romden Road			10 October 1980	TQ9034142596; 51°09′03″N 0°43′13″E		1107904	Upload Photo	Q26401692
Timber Framed Barn at Romden Castle to the North East of Romden Cottage	II	Romden Road			10 October 1980	TQ8971042157; 51°08′50″N 0°42′39″E		1071347	Upload Photo	Q26326472
Windy Barn	II	Romden Road, TN27 8RA			10 October 1980	TQ8943442195; 51°08′52″N 0°42′25″E		1071351	Upload Photo	Q26326477
Ebenezer Farmhouse	II	Shenley Farm Road			10 October 1980	TQ8579542341; 51°09′01″N 0°39′18″E		1325219	Upload Photo	Q26610795
Hayland Farmhouse	II	Shenley Farm Road			10 October 1980	TQ8584342396; 51°09′02″N 0°39′21″E		1362724	Upload Photo	Q26644595
Oasthouse to North West of Hayland Farmhouse	II	Shenley Farm Road			10 October 1980	TQ8582242406; 51°09′03″N 0°39′20″E		1071353	Upload Photo	Q26326478
West Hoy Farmhouse	II*	Shenley Farm Road			14 February 1967	TQ8608542329; 51°09′00″N 0°39′33″E		1071352	Upload Photo	Q17556188
White House Farmhouse	II	Shenley Farm Road			10 October 1980	TQ8536042492; 51°09′06″N 0°38′56″E		1071354	Upload Photo	Q26326480
Bell Cottage	II	Smarden Bell Road			10 October 1980	TQ8695842936; 51°09′18″N 0°40′19″E		1362725	Upload Photo	Q26644596
Dodges Farmhouse	II	Smarden Bell Road			10 October 1980	TQ8821043975; 51°09′51″N 0°41′26″E		1323748	Upload Photo	Q26609448
Hegg Hill	II	Smarden Bell Road			14 February 1967	TQ8767043505; 51°09′36″N 0°40′57″E		1362727	Upload Photo	Q26644598
Hegg Hill Barn	II	Smarden Bell Road, TN27 8NX			10 October 1980	TQ8764943481; 51°09′35″N 0°40′56″E		1119645	Upload Photo	Q26412954
Kite Farmhouse	II	Smarden Bell Road			10 October 1980	TQ8930244595; 51°10′09″N 0°42′23″E		1071355	Upload Photo	Q26326481
Little Hegg Hill	II	Smarden Bell Road, TN27 8NX			10 October 1980	TQ8786143589; 51°09′39″N 0°41′07″E		1119643	Upload Photo	Q26412952
Littlegates	II	Smarden Bell Road			14 February 1967	TQ8819643906; 51°09′48″N 0°41′25″E		1071356	Upload Photo	Q26326483
Park Farmhouse	II	Smarden Bell Road			14 February 1967	TQ8903544531; 51°10′08″N 0°42′09″E		1325224	Upload Photo	Q26610800
Pear Tree Cottage	II	Smarden Bell Road			10 October 1980	TQ8842444202; 51°09′58″N 0°41′37″E		1362726	Upload Photo	Q26644597
Prestbury	II	Smarden Bell Road, Smarden Bell			10 October 1980	TQ8705343031; 51°09′21″N 0°40′24″E		1325222	Upload Photo	Q26610798
The Bell Inn	II	Smarden Bell Road			10 October 1980	TQ8698042948; 51°09′19″N 0°40′21″E		1107871	Upload Photo	Q26401661
Westover Farmhouse	II	Smarden Bell Road			10 October 1980	TQ8741743217; 51°09′27″N 0°40′43″E		1071357	Upload Photo	Q26326484
Limekiln Farmhouse	II	The Cut			10 October 1980	TQ8694441309; 51°08′26″N 0°40′16″E		1325979	Upload Photo	Q26611489
Amberstone	II	The Street			14 February 1967	TQ8804142320; 51°08′57″N 0°41′14″E		1071361	Upload Photo	Q26326488
Chessenden	II*	The Street			17 September 1952	TQ8827042405; 51°09′00″N 0°41′26″E		1359673	Upload Photo	Q17556887
Church of St Michael	I	The Street			14 February 1967	TQ8797742293; 51°08′56″N 0°41′11″E		1071358	Upload Photo	Q17582896
Dragon Cottage	II*	The Street			17 September 1952	TQ8809642333; 51°08′58″N 0°41′17″E		1071360	Upload Photo	Q17556193
Gillets House	II	The Street			14 February 1967	TQ8806142386; 51°08′59″N 0°41′15″E		1119635	Upload Photo	Q26412944
Hadley Cottage	II	The Street			14 February 1967	TQ8807842331; 51°08′58″N 0°41′16″E		1119593	Upload Photo	Q26412906
Heathfield Cottage	II	The Street			14 February 1967	TQ8805742324; 51°08′57″N 0°41′15″E		1362691	Upload Photo	Q26644564
Library Cottage	II	The Street			10 October 1980	TQ8815042348; 51°08′58″N 0°41′20″E		1071362	Upload Photo	Q26326490
Menny's Cottage	II	The Street			12 March 1996	TQ8819442359; 51°08′58″N 0°41′22″E		1255535	Upload Photo	Q26547116
Militia House	II	The Street			12 March 1996	TQ8818342362; 51°08′58″N 0°41′21″E		1255534	Upload Photo	Q26547115
Parsonage House	II	The Street, TN27 8QA			14 February 1967	TQ8801742325; 51°08′57″N 0°41′13″E		1362689	Upload Photo	Q26644562
Perrin House	II	The Street			10 October 1980	TQ8814942377; 51°08′59″N 0°41′20″E		1323110	Upload Photo	Q26608863
Providence House and the Pent House	II	The Street, TN27 8QA			14 February 1967	TQ8802542310; 51°08′57″N 0°41′13″E		1119650	Upload Photo	Q26412959
The Brothers House	II	The Street			14 February 1967	TQ8814542387; 51°08′59″N 0°41′19″E		1362690	Upload Photo	Q26644563
The Chequers Inn	II	The Street			14 February 1967	TQ8803142342; 51°08′58″N 0°41′13″E		1323771	Upload Photo	Q26609470
The Old School House	II	The Street			14 February 1967	TQ8805642348; 51°08′58″N 0°41′15″E		1071359	Upload Photo	Q26326486
The Zion Chapel	II	The Street			10 October 1980	TQ8825542387; 51°08′59″N 0°41′25″E		1362692	Upload Photo	Q26644565
Vesperhawk House	II	The Street			14 February 1967	TQ8838141986; 51°08′46″N 0°41′31″E		1071363	Upload Photo	Q26326491
Village Pump	II	The Street			10 October 1980	TQ8810742345; 51°08′58″N 0°41′17″E		1359668	Upload Photo	Q26641887
East End Cottages	II	1-4, The Street			10 October 1980	TQ8822742382; 51°08′59″N 0°41′24″E		1063705	Upload Photo	Q26317002
Gilham Barn	II	TN27 8QW, Tylden			10 October 1980	TQ8730441099; 51°08′19″N 0°40′34″E		1065716	Upload Photo	Q26318761
Gillham	II	Tylden			10 October 1980	TQ8732041047; 51°08′17″N 0°40′34″E		1071364	Upload Photo	Q26326493
Kelsham Farmhouse	II	Tylden			10 October 1980	TQ8711040809; 51°08′10″N 0°40′23″E		1359675	Upload Photo	Q26641893
Little Gillham	II	Tylden			10 October 1980	TQ8737541169; 51°08′21″N 0°40′37″E		1362693	Upload Photo	Q26644566
Tilden Baptist Chapel	II	Tylden			10 October 1980	TQ8733441160; 51°08′21″N 0°40′35″E		1366289	Upload Photo	Q26647895
Fuller Barn Cottage	II	Water Lane			10 October 1980	TQ8747442812; 51°09′14″N 0°40′46″E		1362713	Upload Photo	Q26644584
Hartnup House	II*	Water Lane			17 September 1952	TQ8792342335; 51°08′58″N 0°41′08″E		1366291	Upload Photo	Q17556973
The Cloth Hall	II*	Water Lane			17 September 1952	TQ8788742357; 51°08′59″N 0°41′06″E		1071366	Upload Photo	Q17556197
The Meeting House	II	Water Lane			10 October 1980	TQ8743542932; 51°09′18″N 0°40′44″E		1071331	Upload Photo	Q26326450
The Roundabout	II	Water Lane, Smarden Bell			10 October 1980	TQ8723643074; 51°09′23″N 0°40′34″E		1071332	Upload Photo	Q26326451
Three Oasthouses and Granary to South West of Gilletts Farmhouse	II	Water Lane			1 November 1972	TQ8792242382; 51°08′59″N 0°41′08″E		1071330	Upload Photo	Q26326448
Waterside House	II	Water Lane			10 October 1980	TQ8797742343; 51°08′58″N 0°41′11″E		1362694	Upload Photo	Q26644567
Wistaria Cottage	II	Water Lane			10 October 1980	TQ8800942355; 51°08′58″N 0°41′12″E		1071365	Upload Photo	Q26326494
Prosser Farm House	II	TN27 8NJ			14 February 1967	TQ8888242816; 51°09′12″N 0°41′58″E		1325168	Upload Photo	Q26610749

== See also ==
- Grade I listed buildings in Kent
- Grade II* listed buildings in Kent

== Sources ==
- Newman, John (2012) [1969], Kent: West and the Weald, The Buildings of England, New Haven and London: Yale University Press, ISBN 978-0-300-18509-6
