= Village sign =

Term in England for a sign at the entrance to a town or village

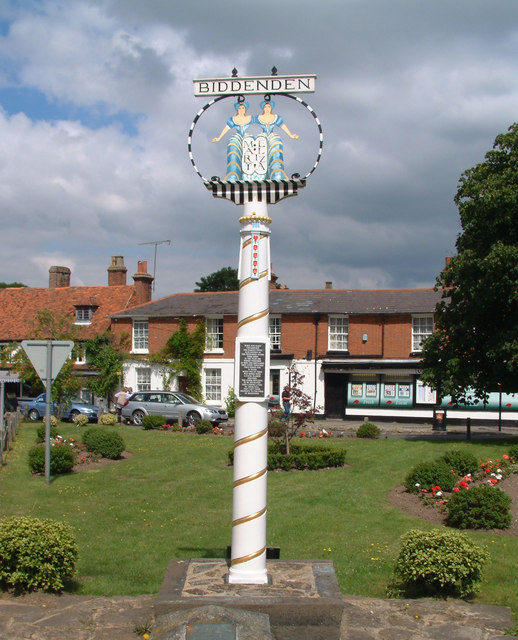
Biddenden village sign in Kent of the two maids of Biddenden

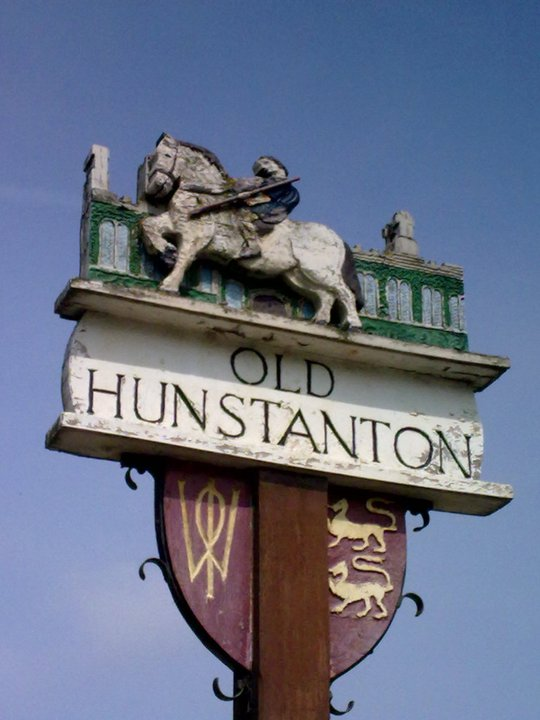
Old Hunstanton village sign in Norfolk

In many parts of England, an ornamental village sign is erected to announce the village name to those entering the village. They are typically placed on the principal road entrance or in a prominent location such as a village green. The design often depicts a particularly characteristic feature of the village or a scene from its history, heritage, or culture. They are typically made of wood or metal or a combination of both, the designs are often made by the local community.

Ornamental timber and iron signs were common historically to identify buildings of importance such as inns or town halls. However, the tradition of village signs is believed to have started in Norfolk early in the 20th century when Edward VII suggested that village signs would aid motorists and give a feature of interest on the Sandringham Estate.

The spread of interest beyond Norfolk can be attributed to Prince Albert, Duke of York (later George VI) who gave a speech to the Royal Academy in 1920 promoting the wider use of village signs. This prompted the Daily Mail to run a nationwide village sign competition. The prize fund exceeded £2,000 and ten awards were made. The winning schemes were exhibited at Australia House, London in October 1920.

The village sign at Biddenden, Kent, featuring the two Biddenden Maids, was one of the successful Daily Mail competition entries. So too was the sign at Bromley, Kent.

Many signs commemorate significant events such as the Coronation of Queen Elizabeth II in 1953, the passing of Millennium or local celebrations such as the centenary of the formation of local councils.

In some places village signs have been surveyed and recorded. In Kent, signs erected in more than half of the county villages have been identified.

In 1929, Harry Carter, an art and woodwork master at Hamond's Grammar School in Swaffham, carved a sign for his home town. By the time of his death in 1983 he had carved over 200 town and village signs.

While the practice is now widespread, decorative village signs are still common in Norfolk and in the neighbouring county of Suffolk as well as Essex and other East Anglian counties. Some village signs take the form of sculptures, such as the sign at Capel St Andrew in Suffolk, which is constructed from scrap metal.

== Gallery ==
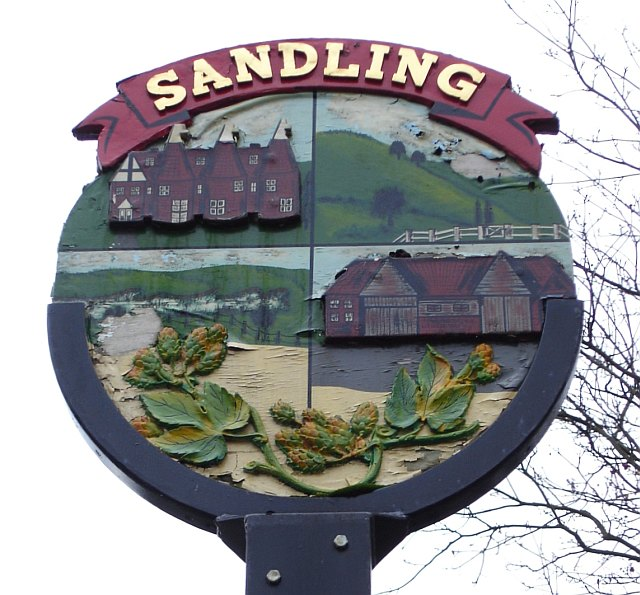
Sandling, Kent

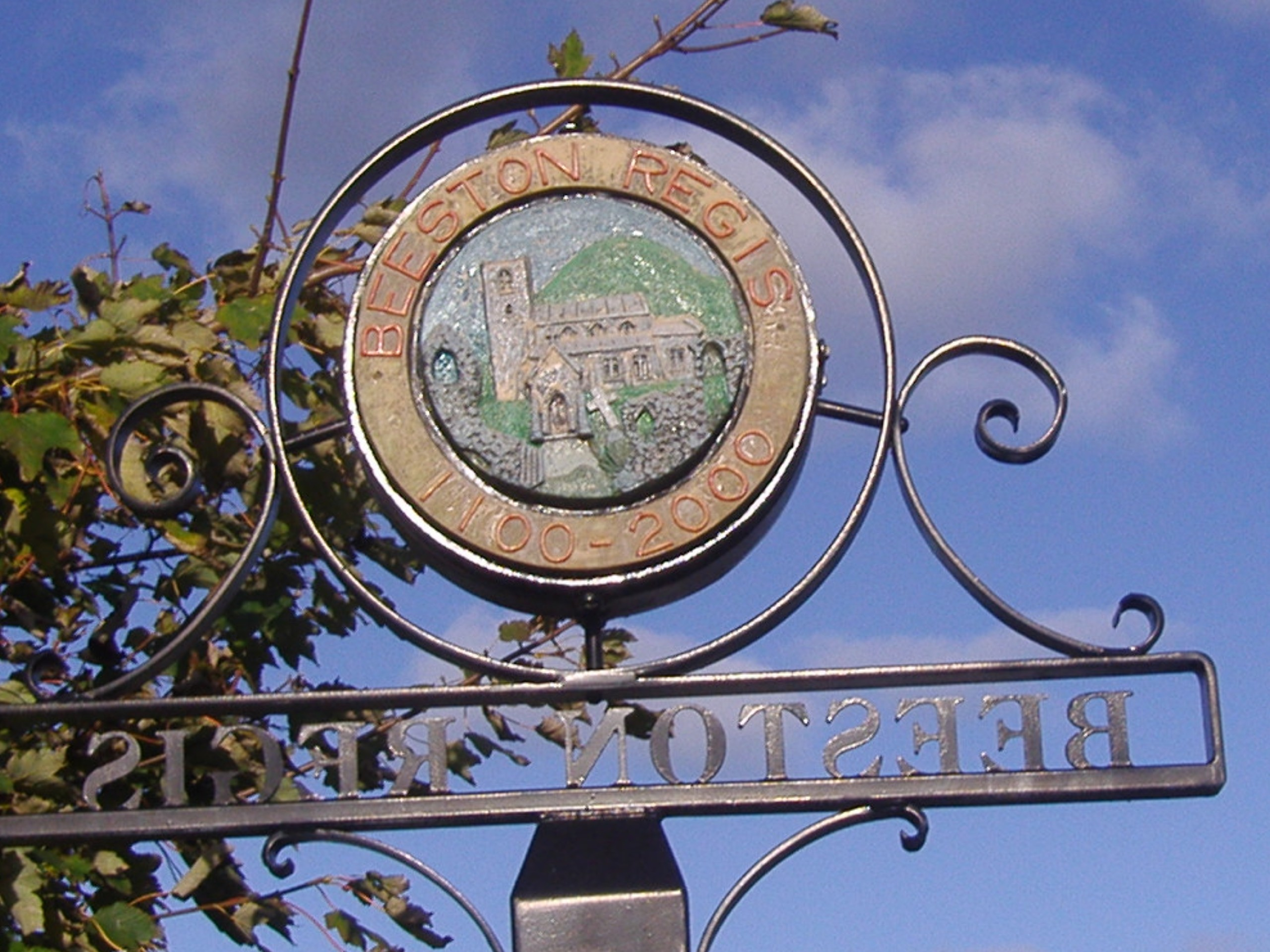
Beeston Regis, Norfolk

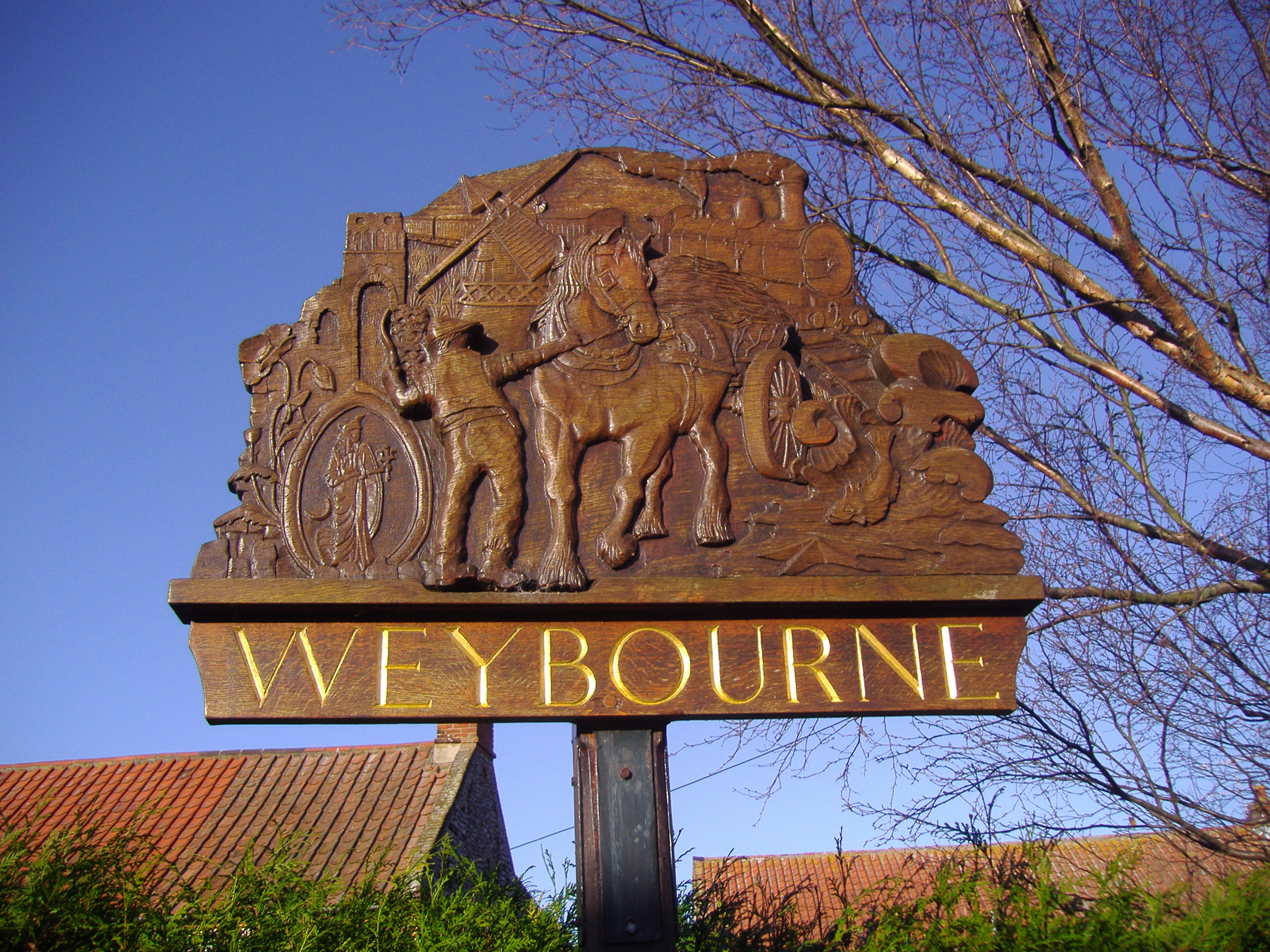
Weybourne, Norfolk

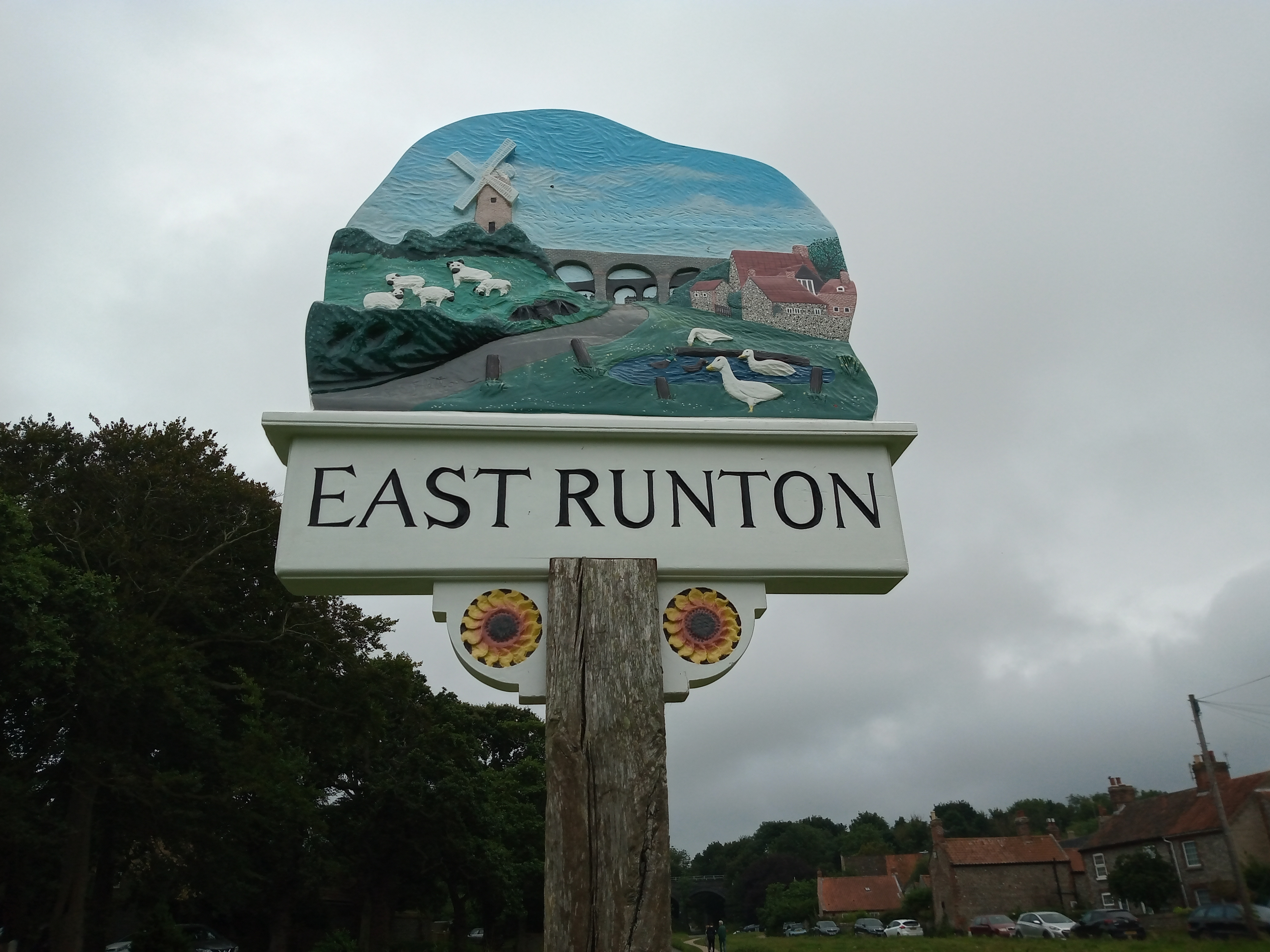
East Runton, Norfolk

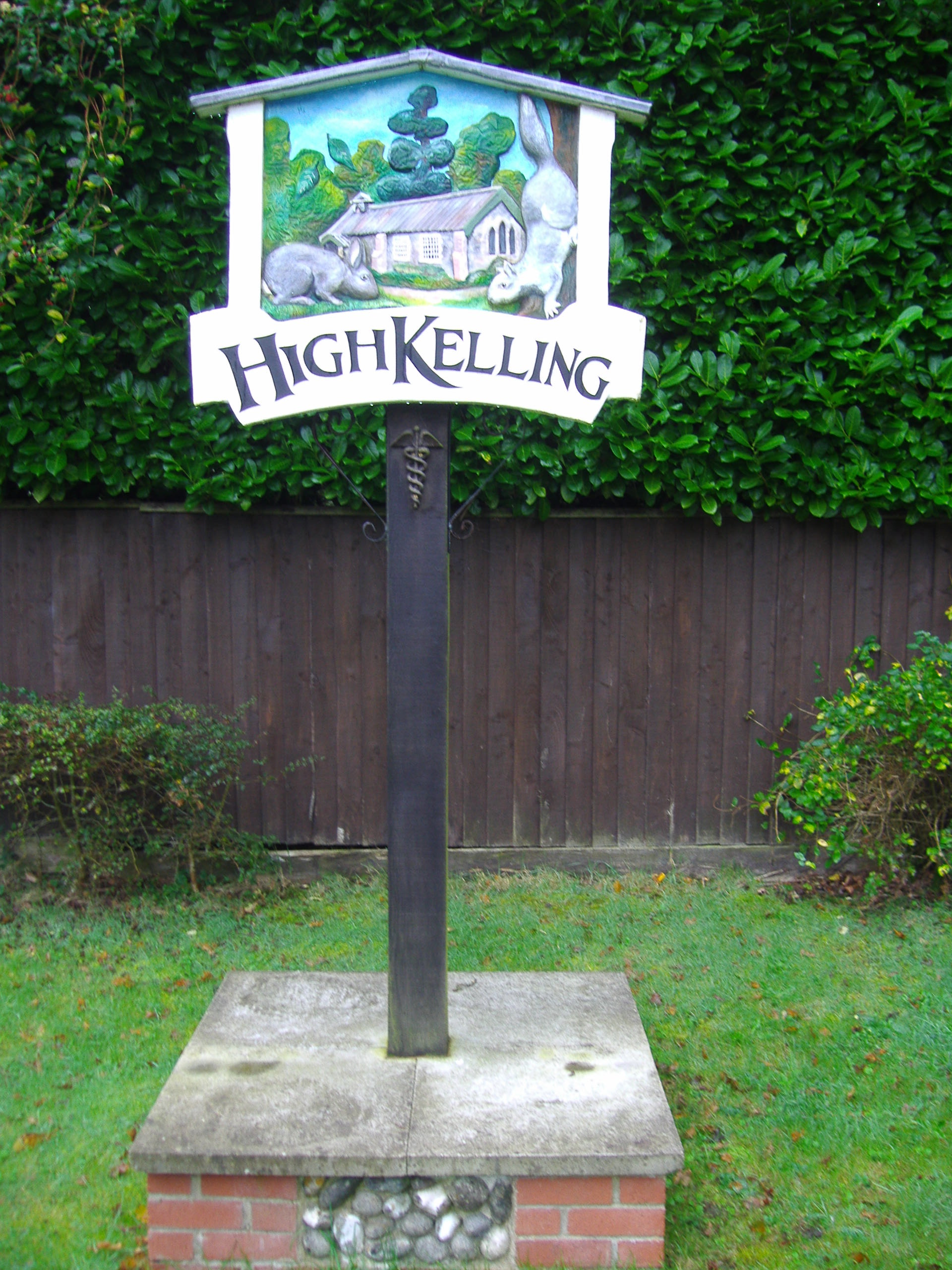
High Kelling, Norfolk

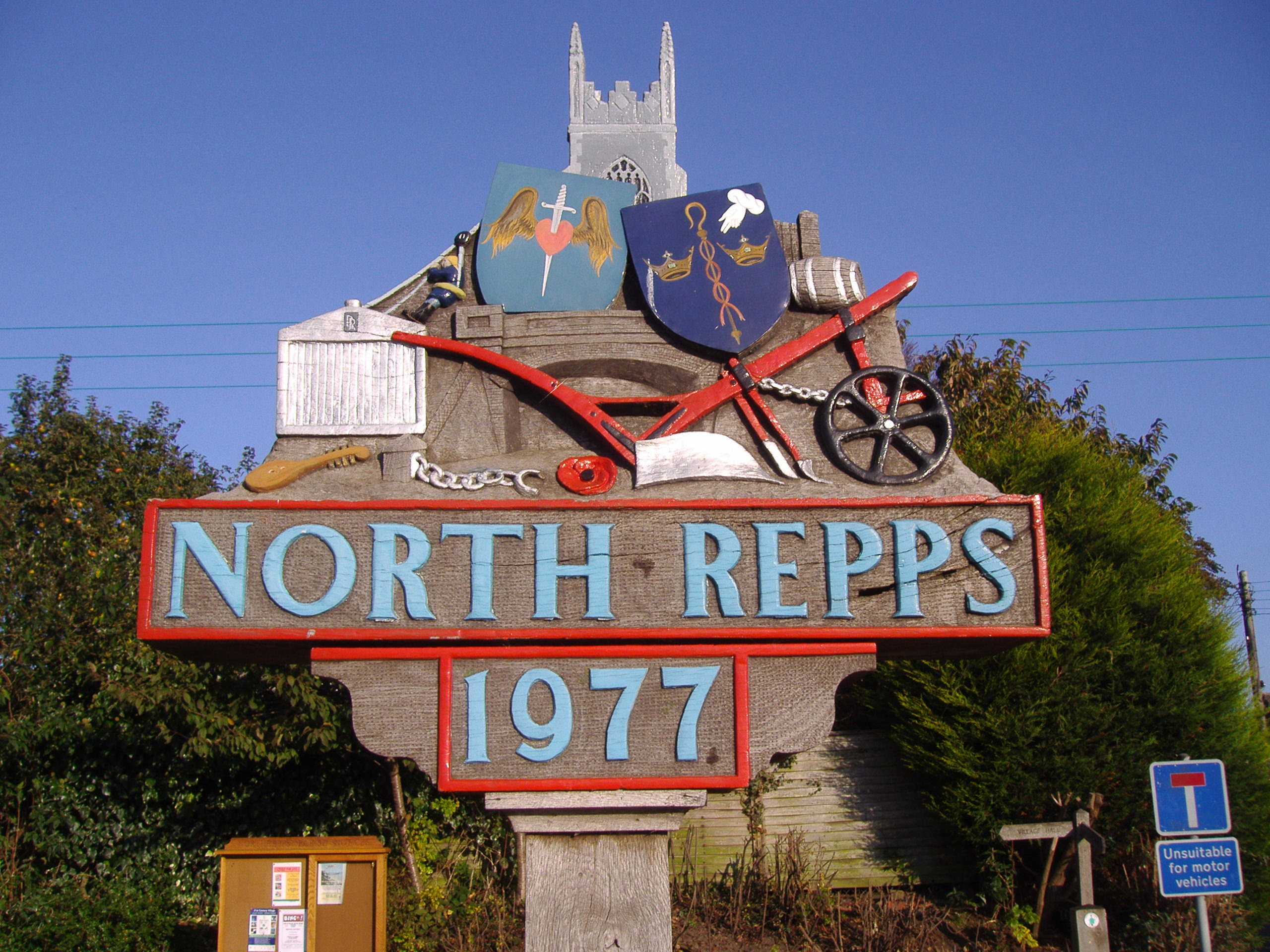
Northrepps, Norfolk

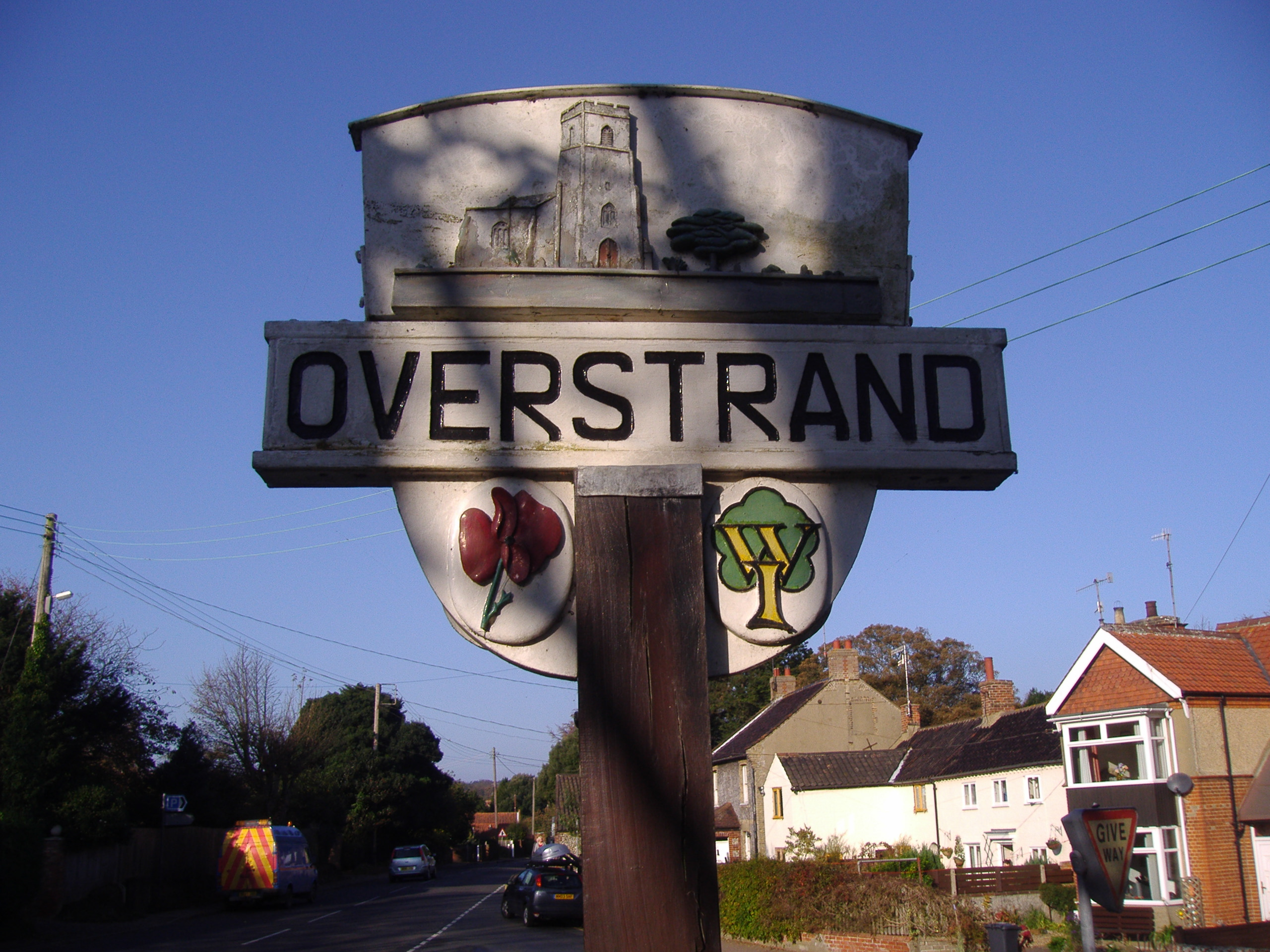
Overstrand, Norfolk

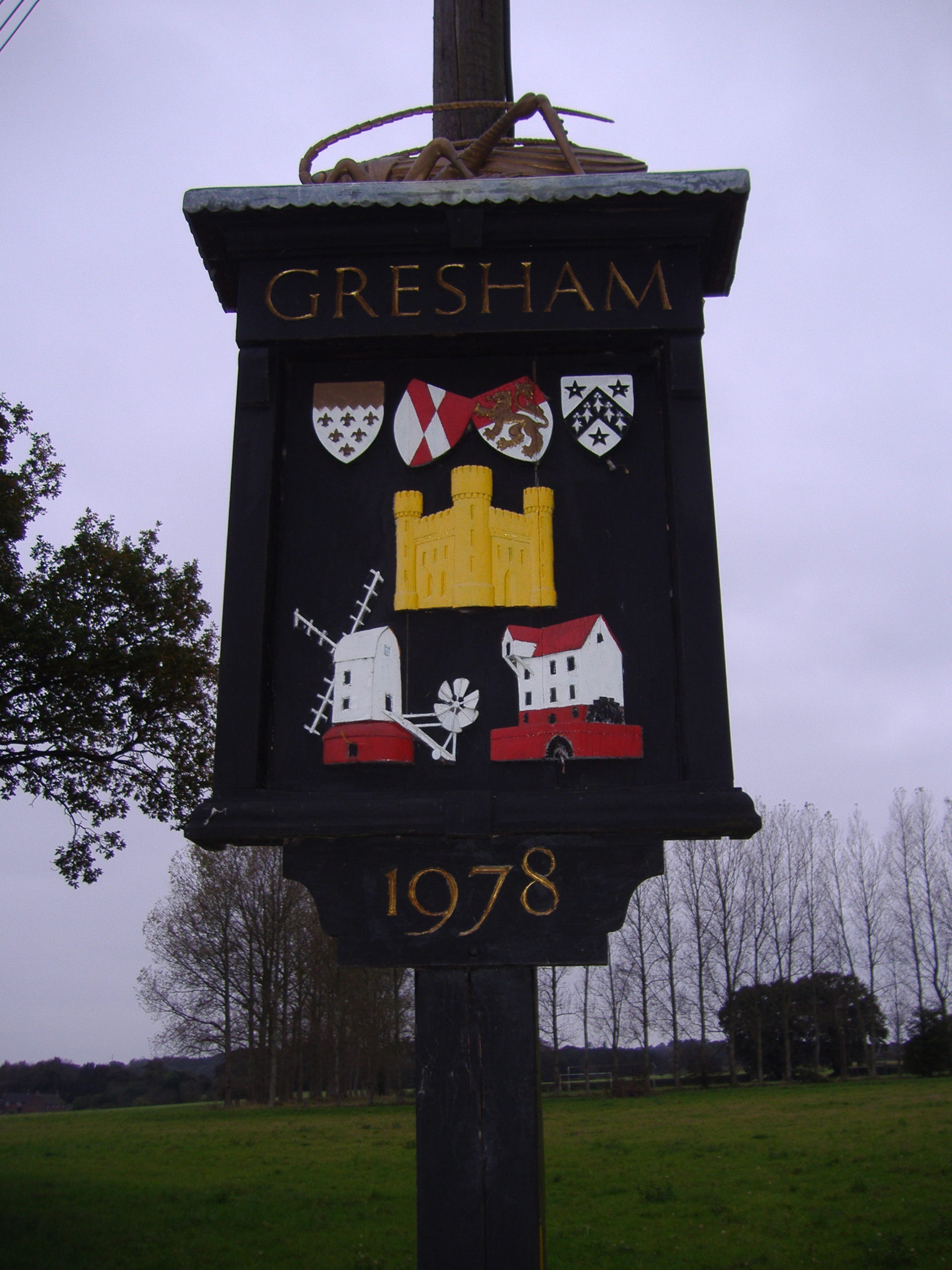
Gresham, Norfolk

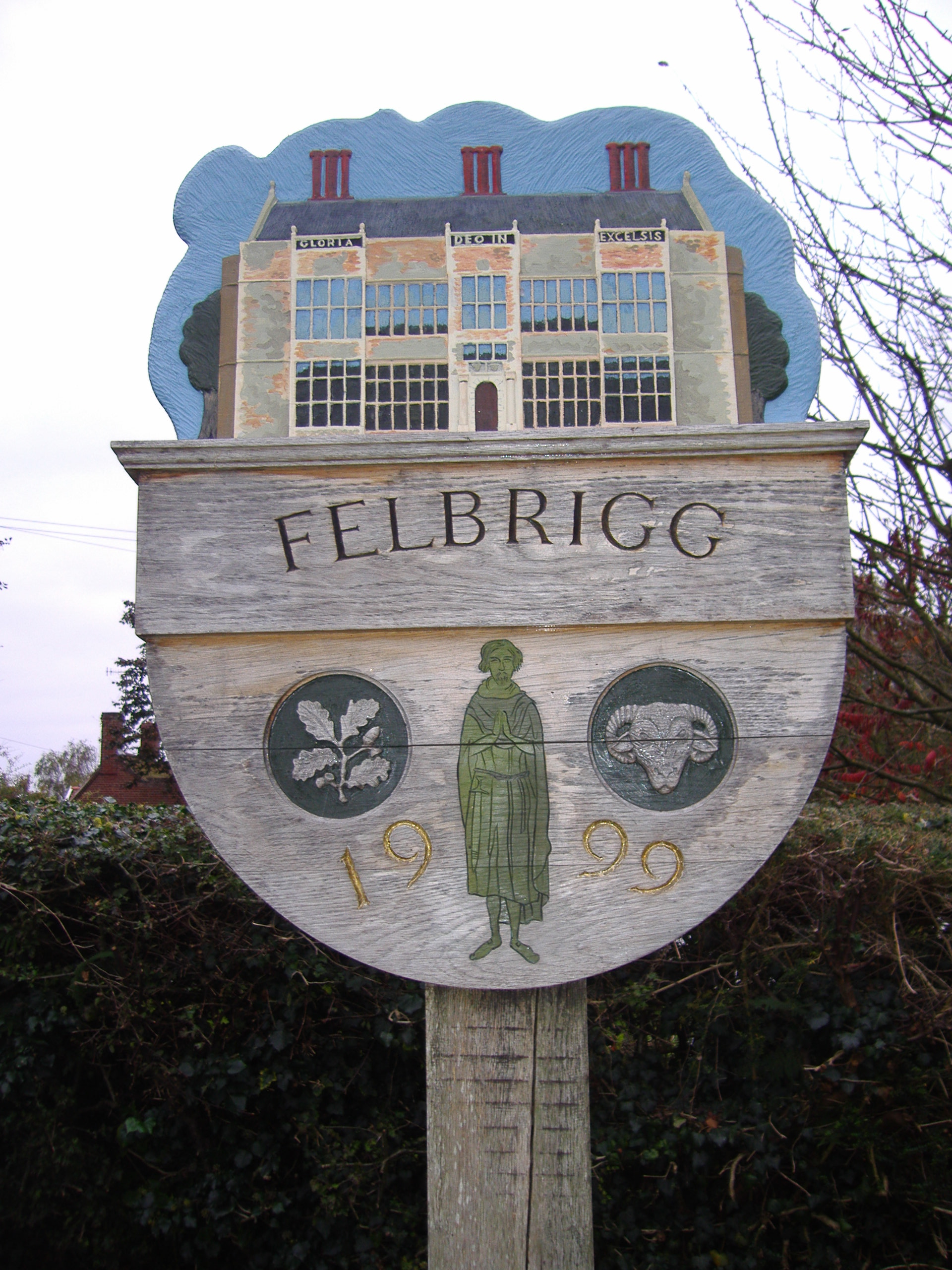
Felbrigg, Norfolk

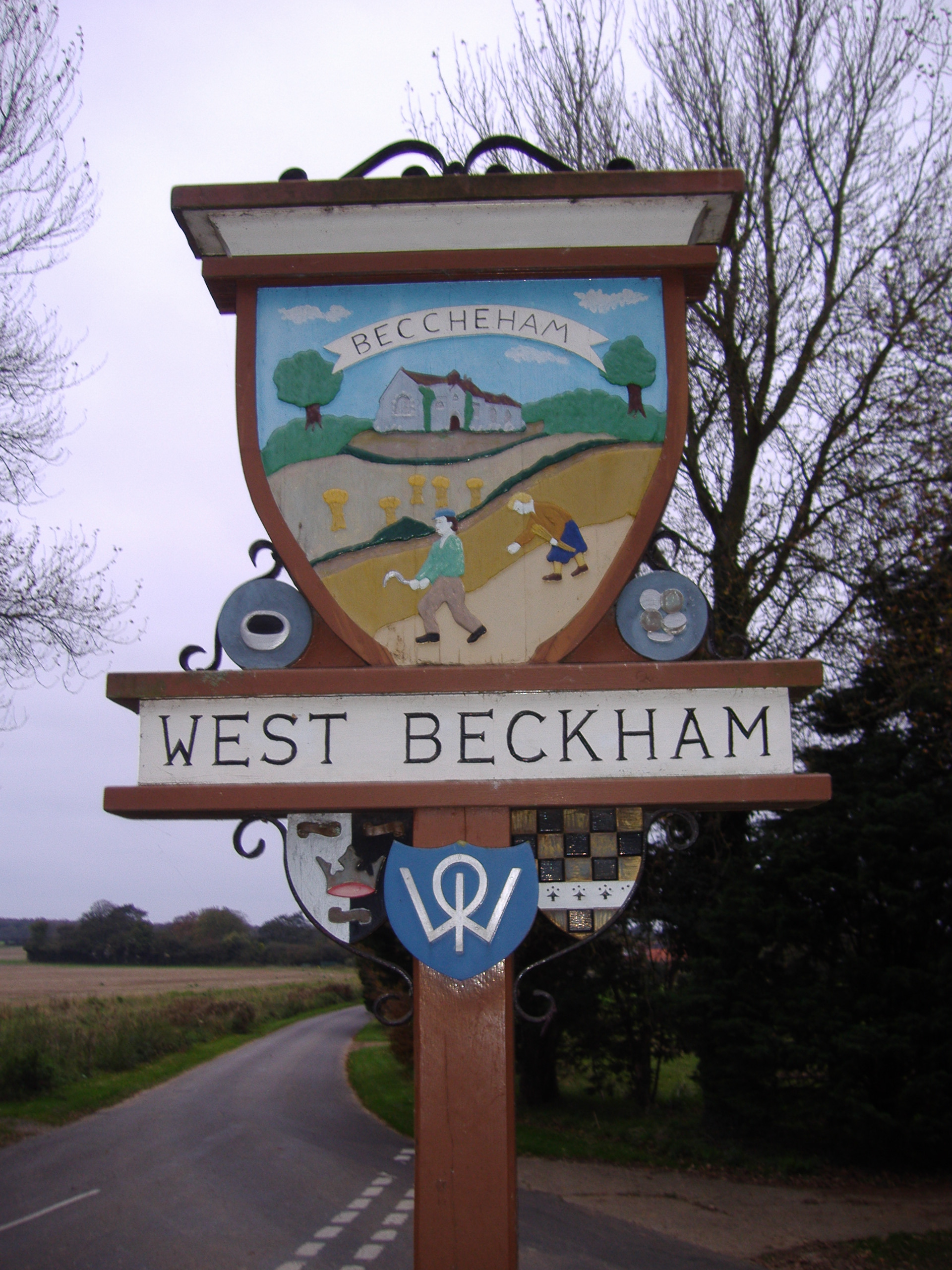
West Beckham, Norfolk

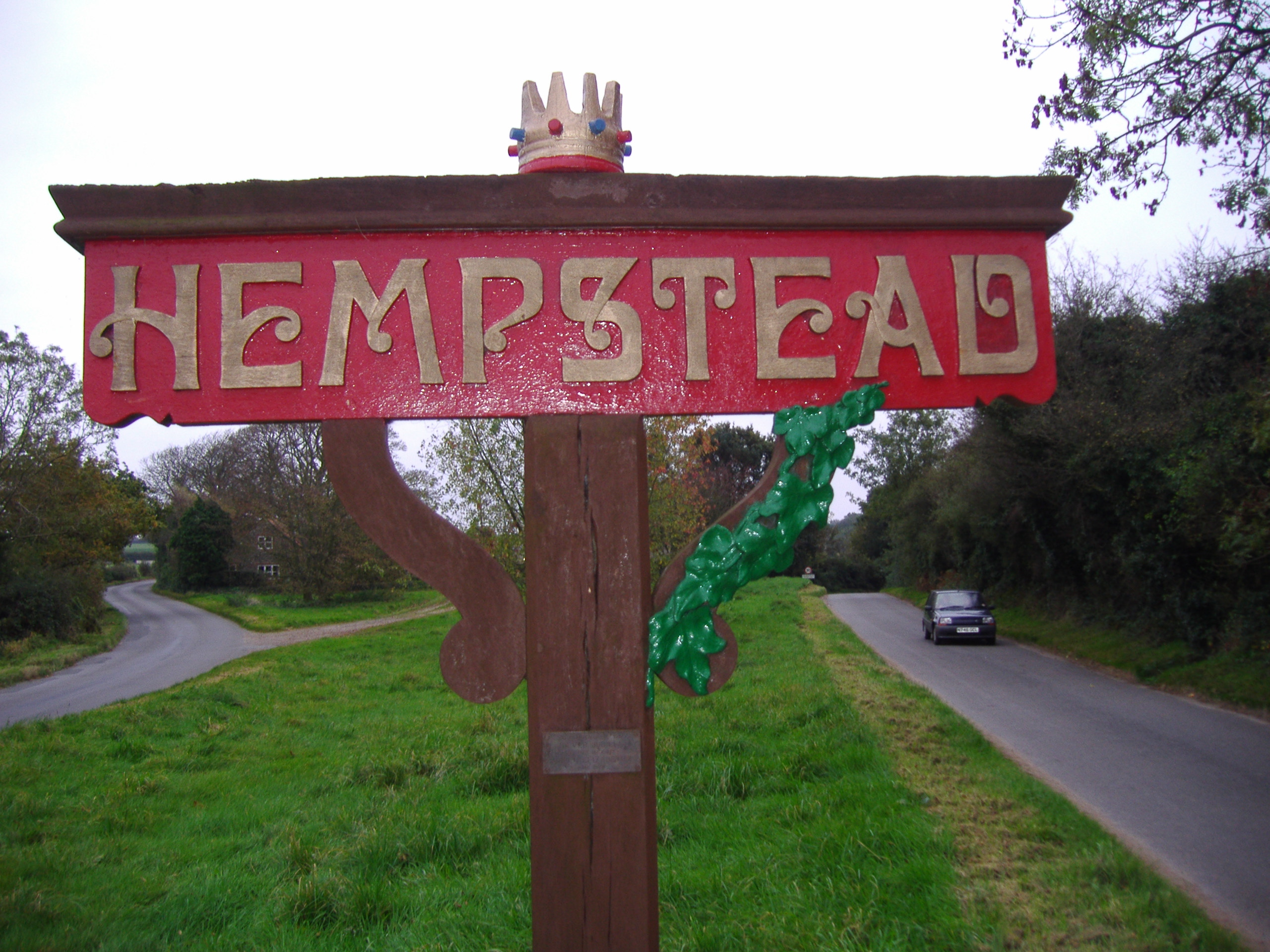
Hempstead, Norfolk

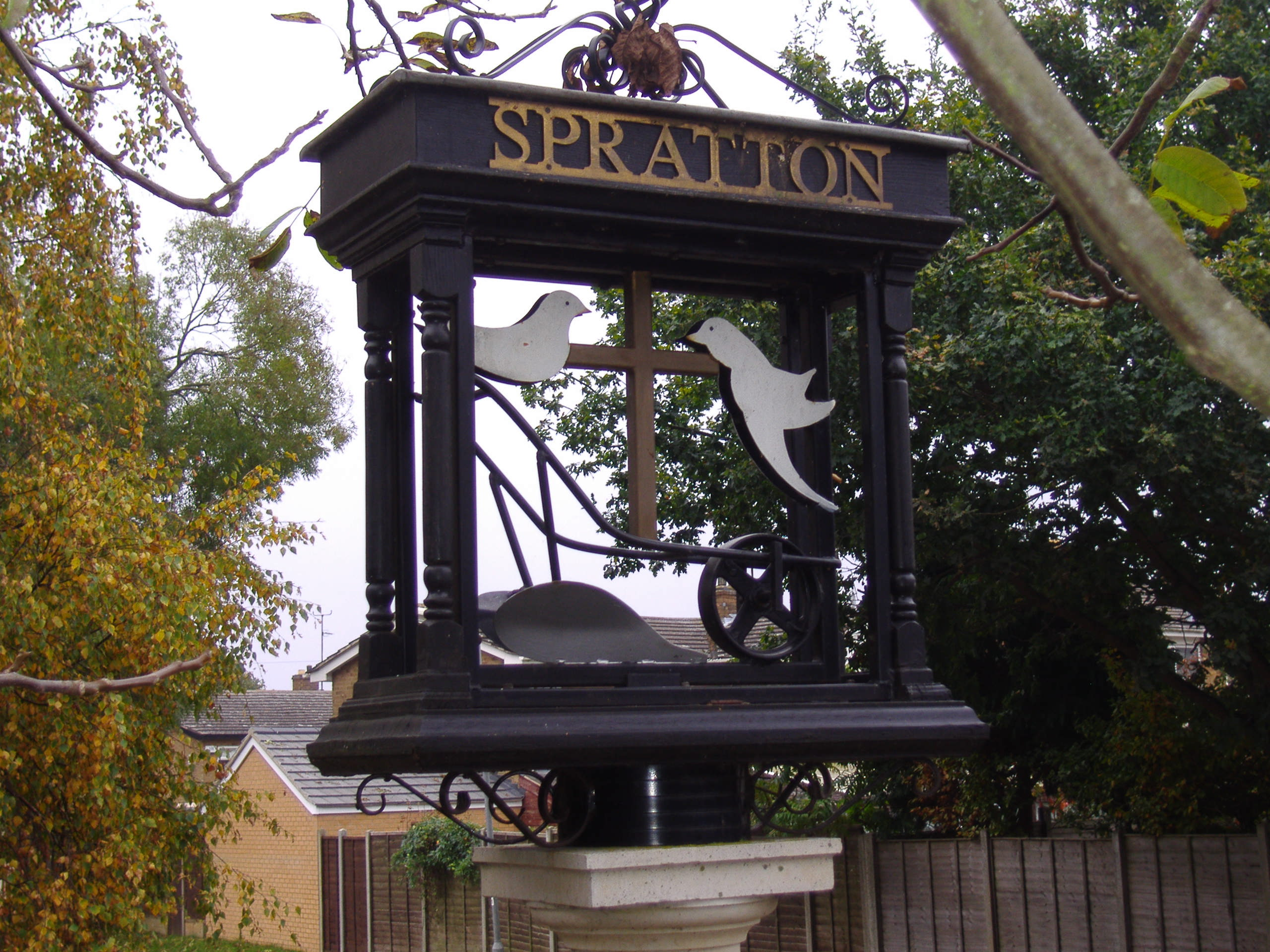
Spratton in Northamptonshire

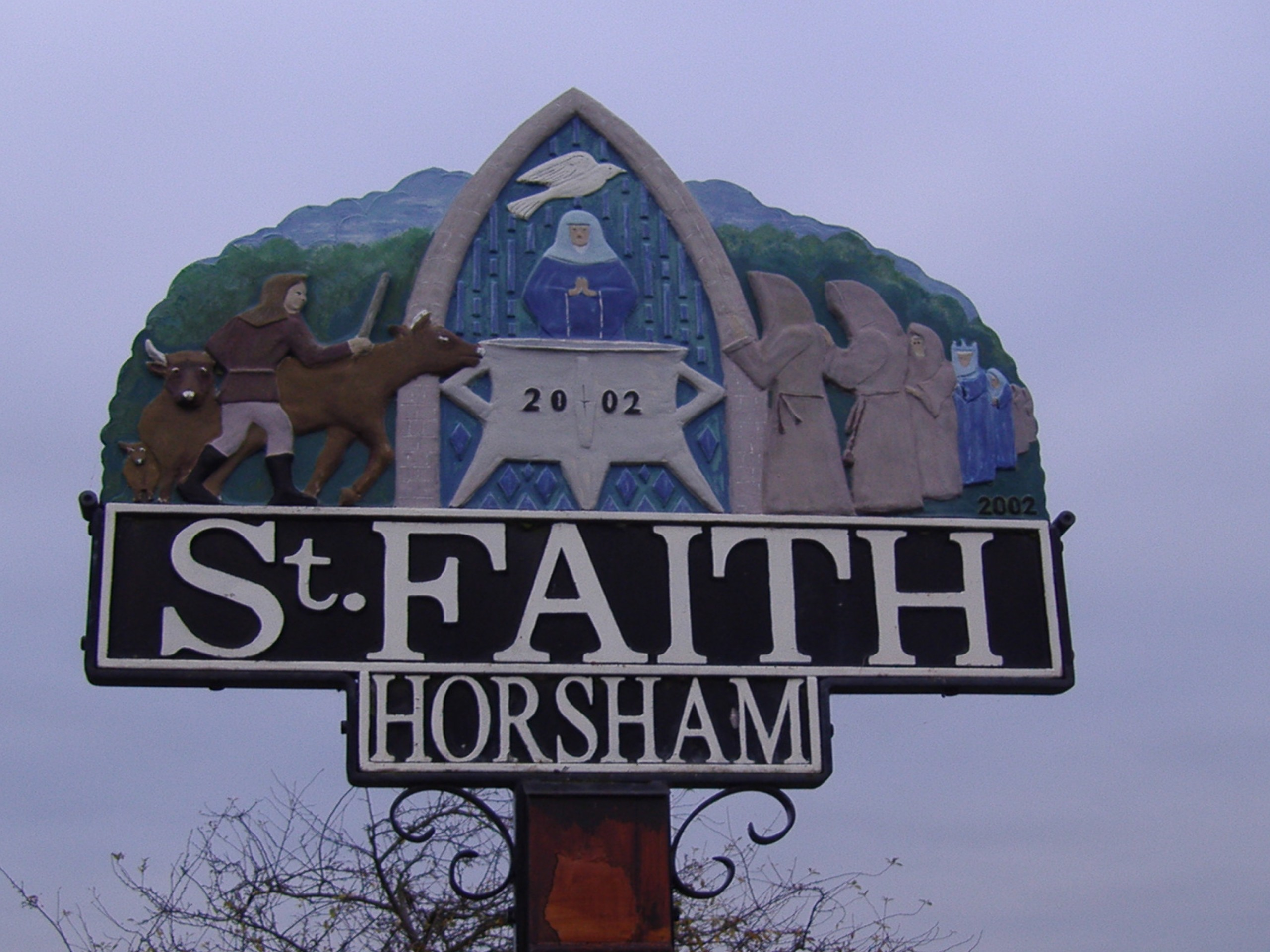
Horsham St Faith, Norfolk

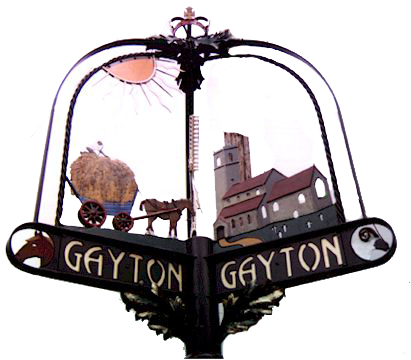
Gayton, West Norfolk

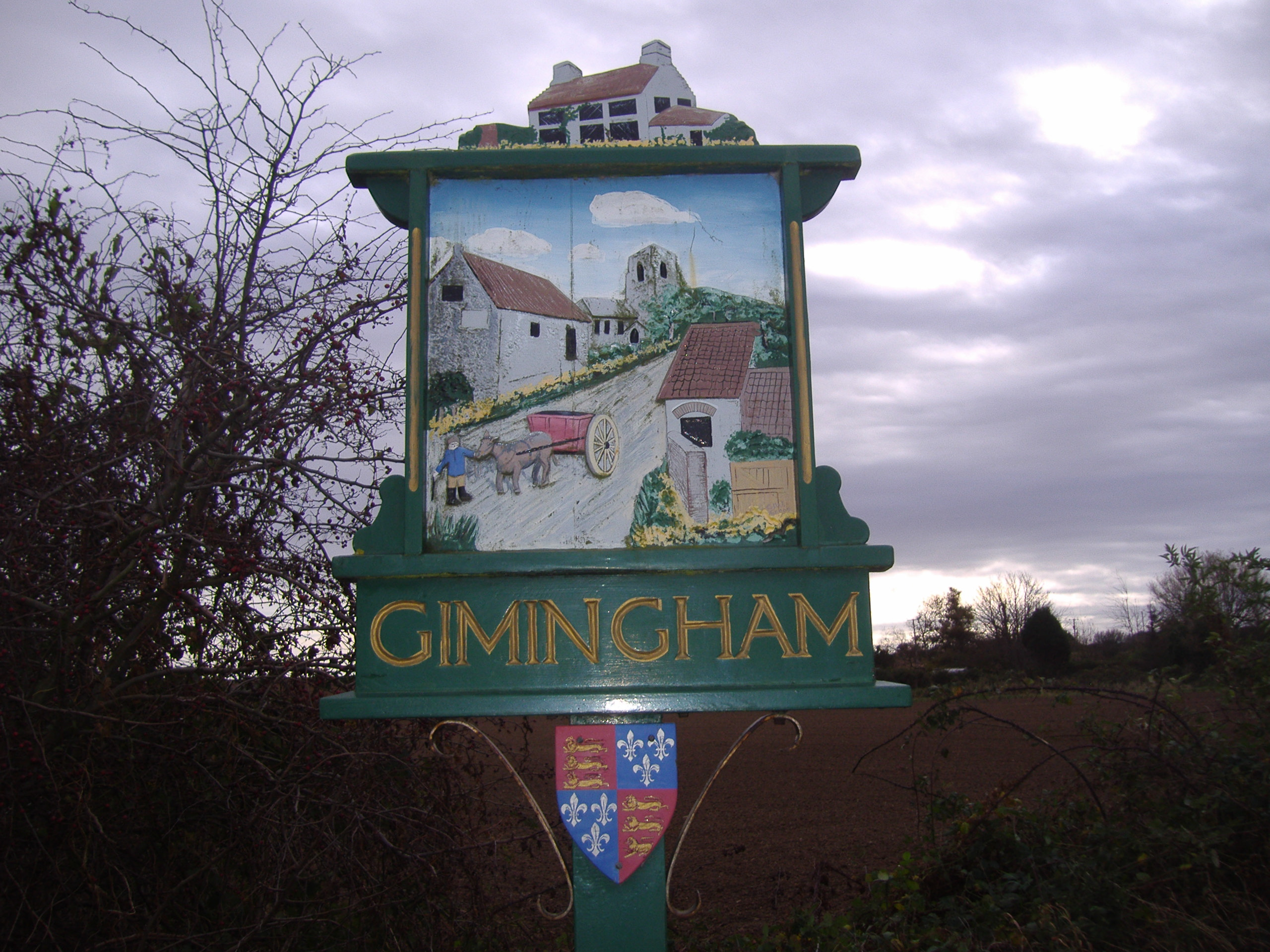
Gimingham, Norfolk

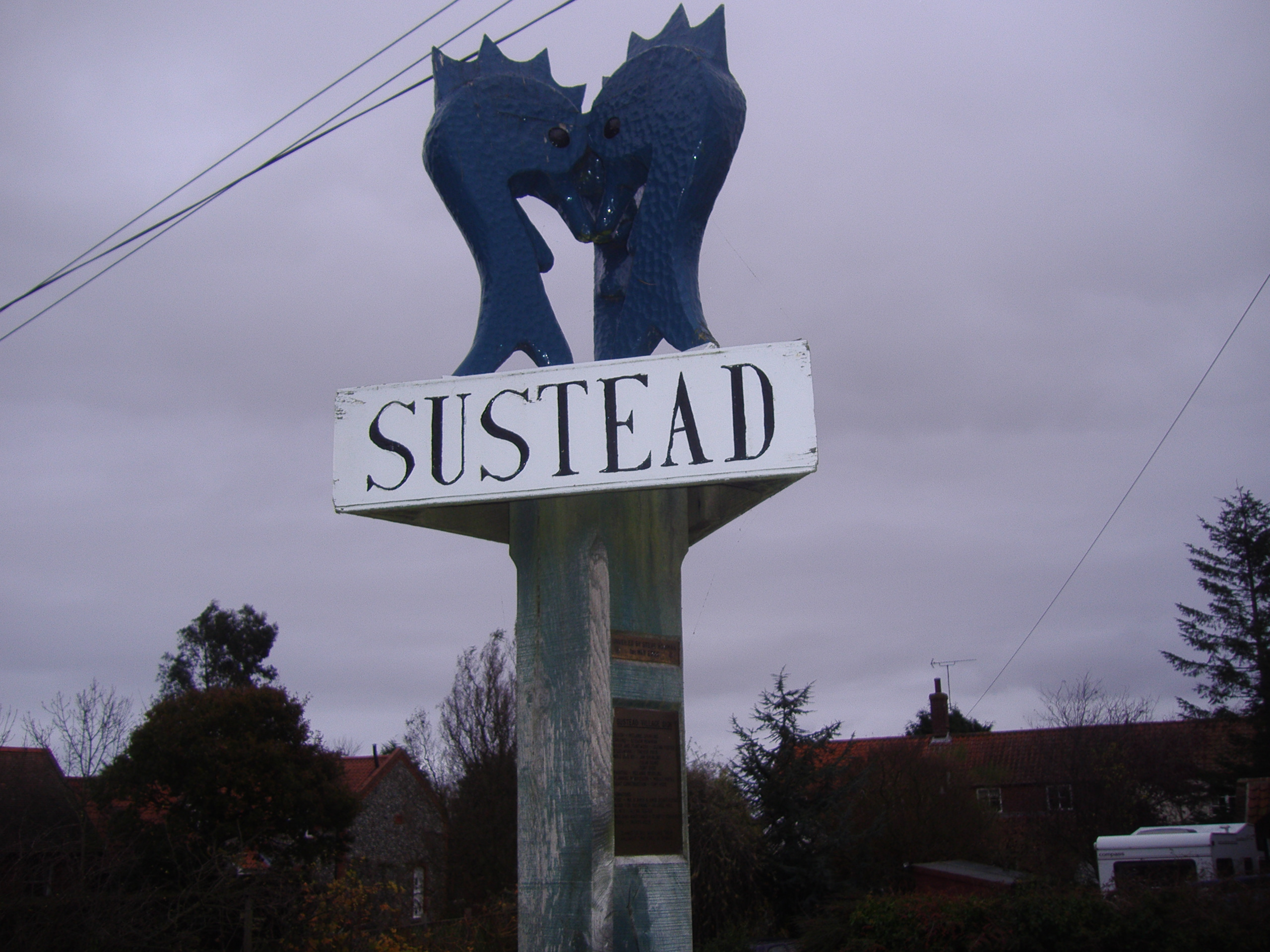
Sustead, Norfolk

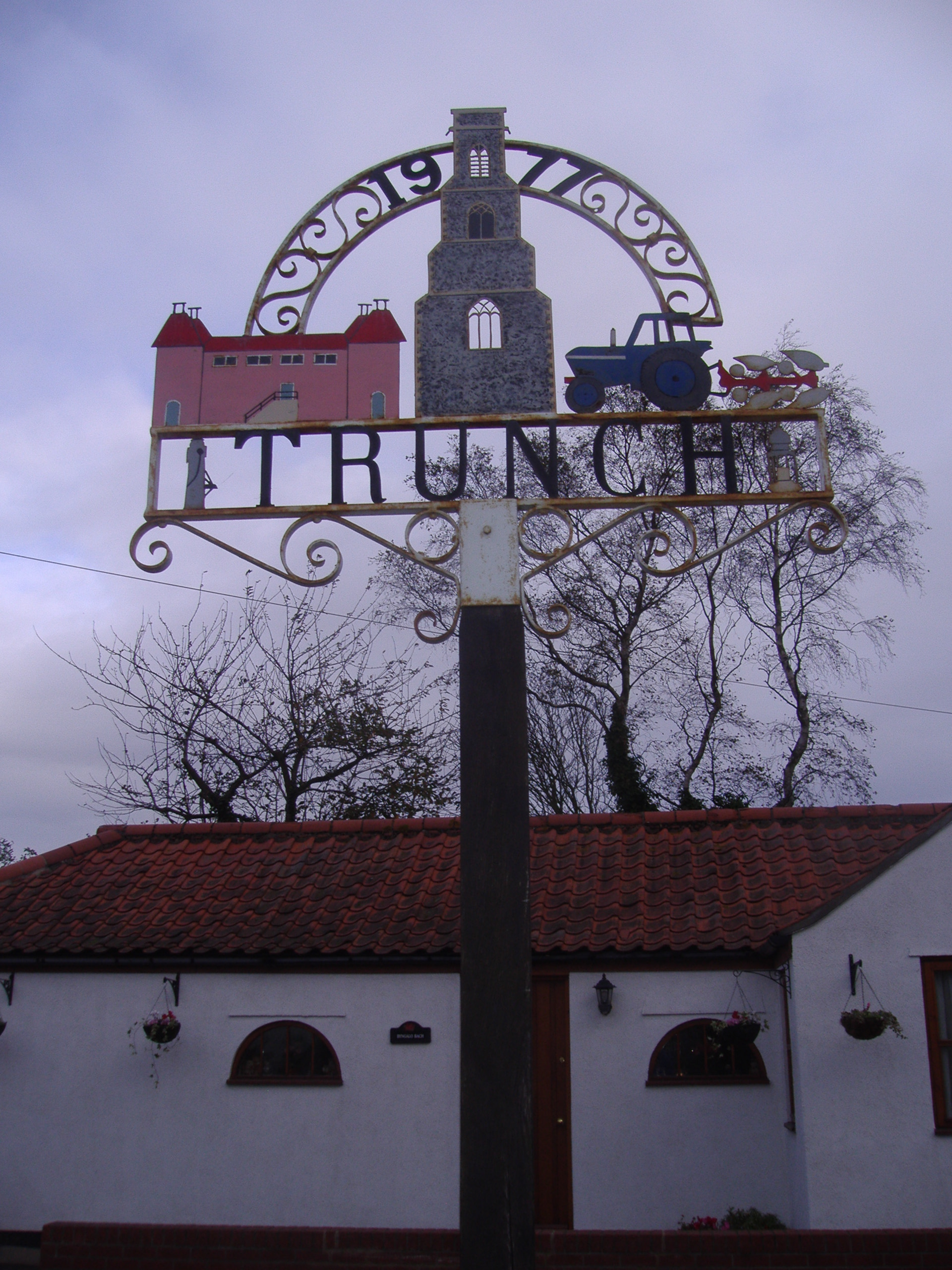
Trunch, Norfolk

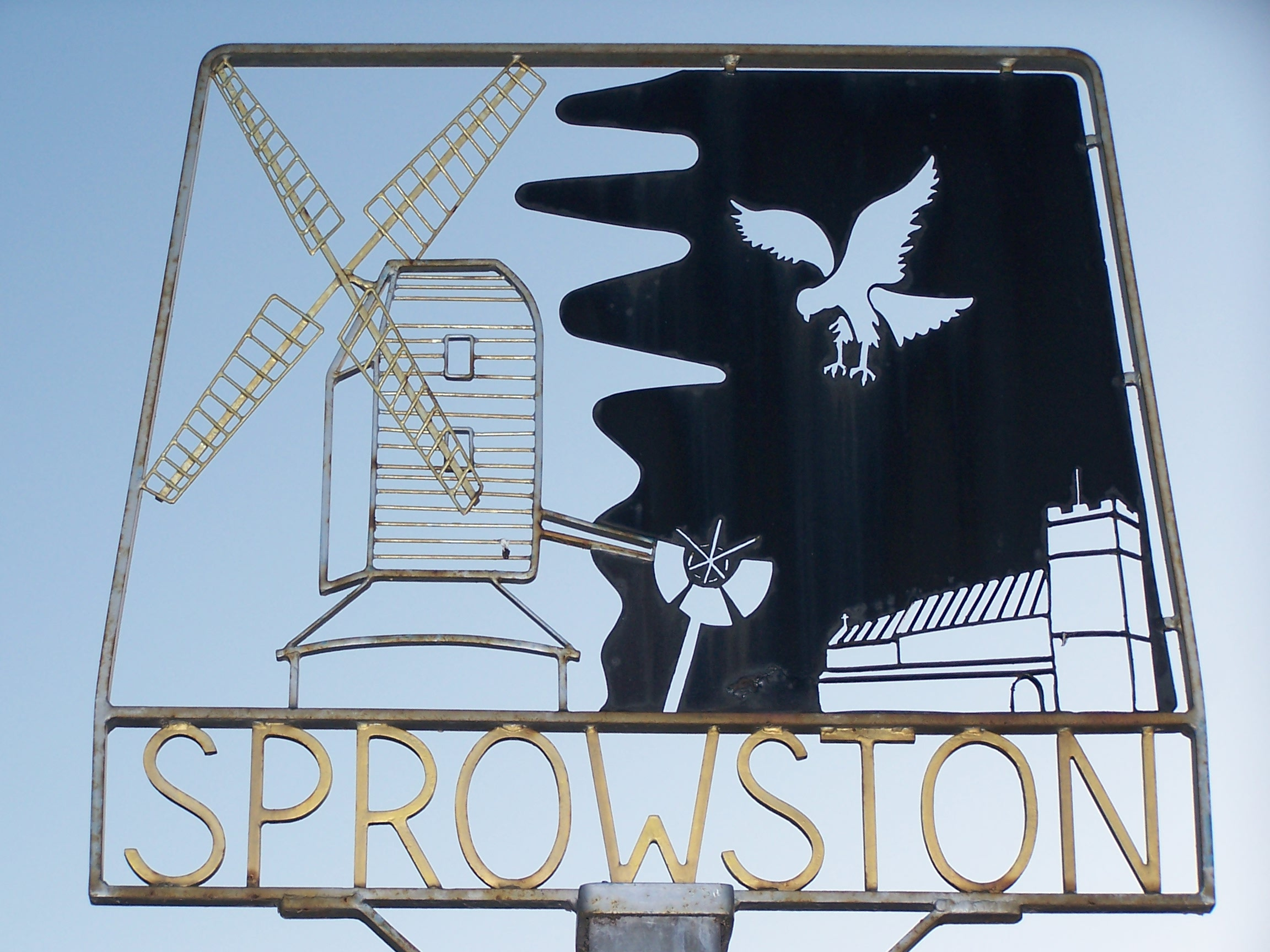
Sprowston, Norfolk

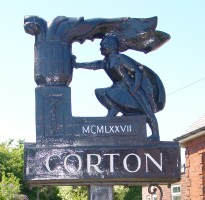
Corton, Suffolk

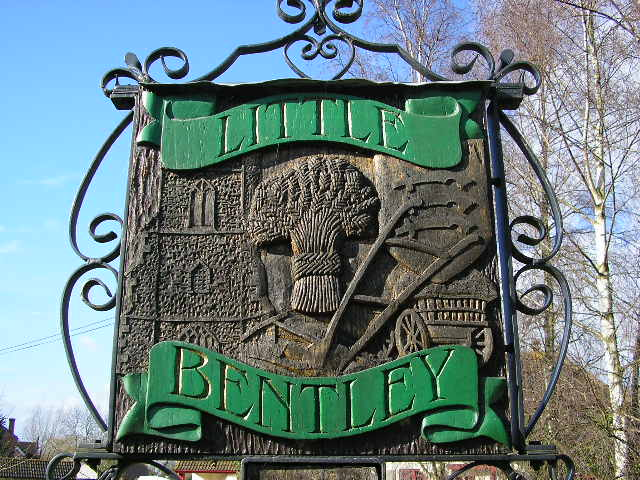
Little Bentley, Essex

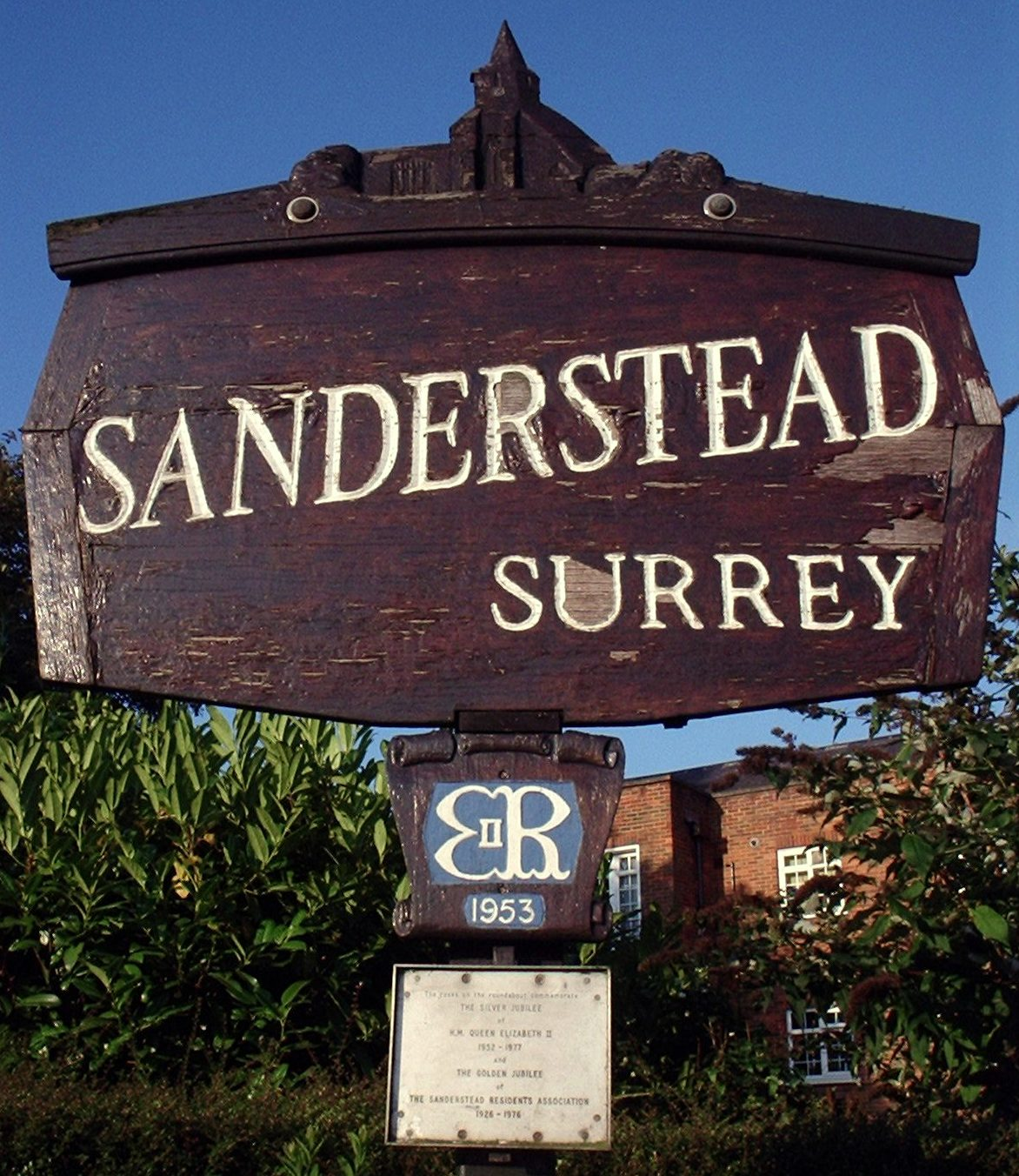
Sanderstead, Croydon

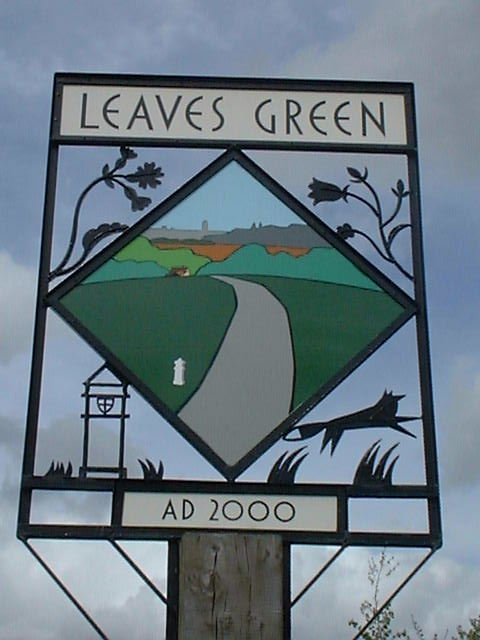
Leaves Green, Bromley

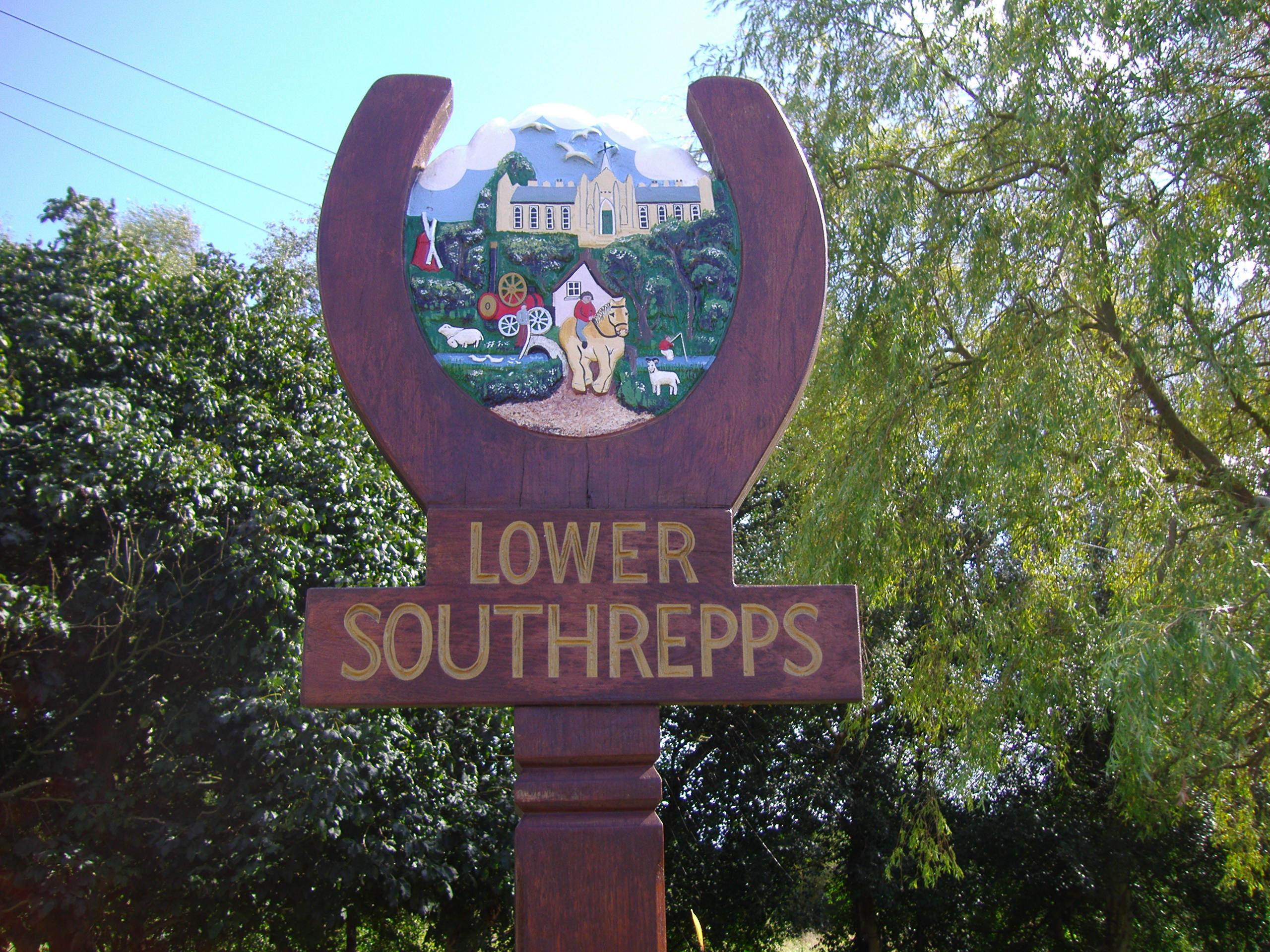
Lower Southrepps, Norfolk

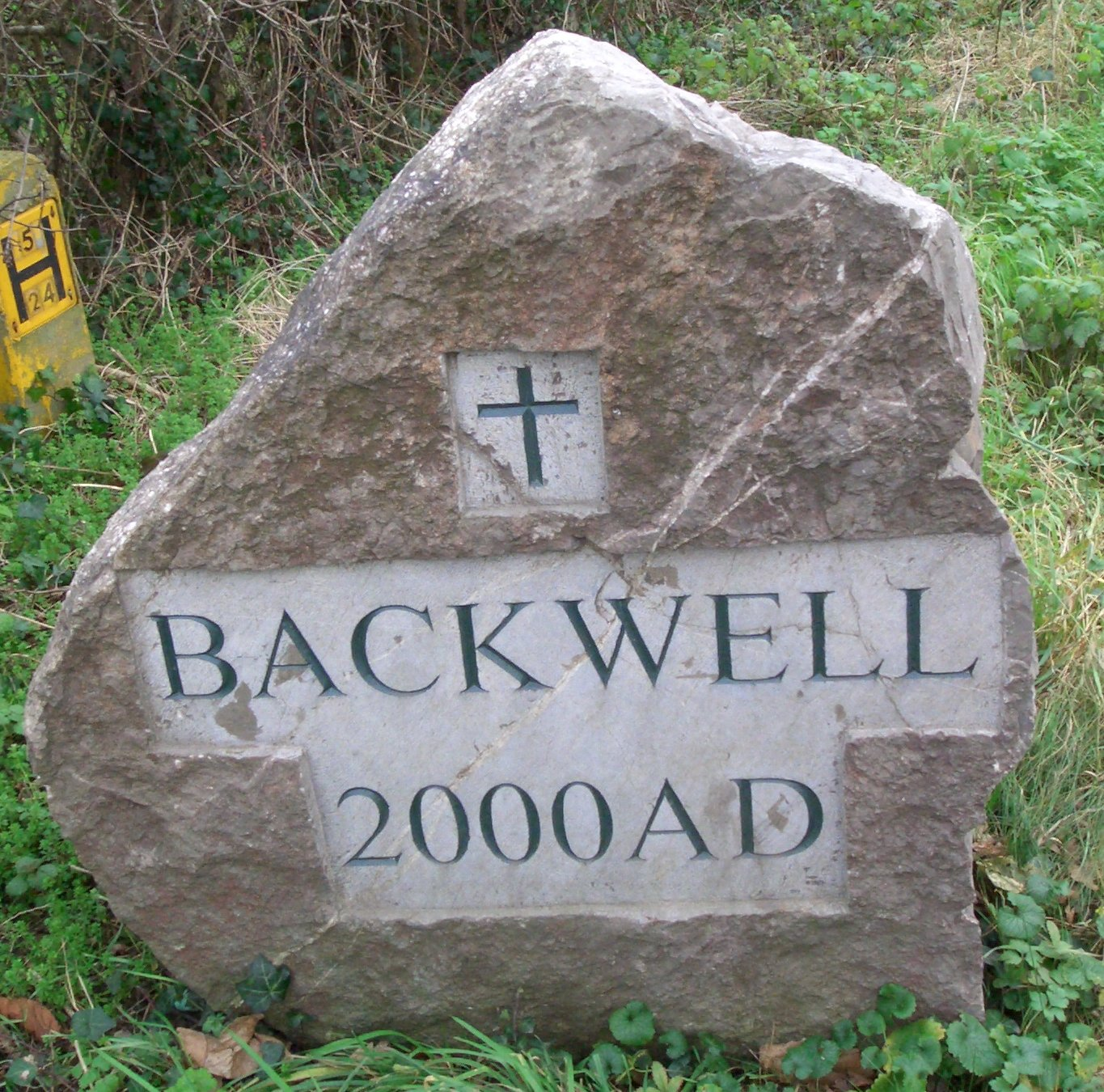
Backwell village sign in Somerset

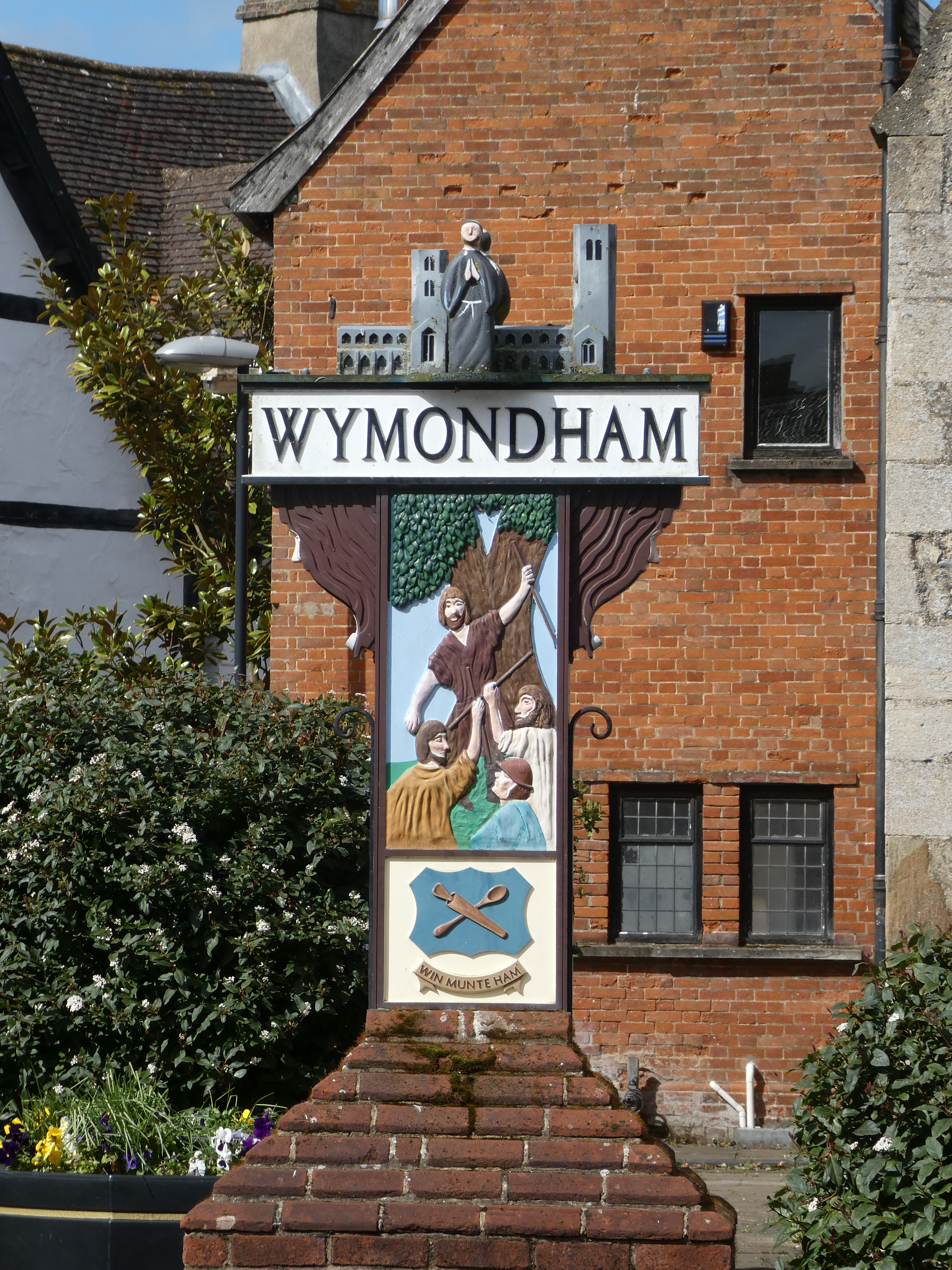
Wymondham, South Norfolk
