= Dole (custom) =

A dole is a form of charitable distribution, usually of food or money, traditionally given at fixed times and places in England. It represents a form of almsgiving, typically with an endowment that funds the distribution in perpetuity.

== Surviving doles ==
This is a table of traditional doles that are still distributed in England.

Name	Location	Benefactor	Date established	Time of year	Recipients	Items given
Royal Maundy	Various (England and Wales)	English monarch	c. 13th century	Maundy Thursday	Pensioners (traditionally the poor elderly)	Maundy coins
Ufton Dole	Ufton Nervet and Padworth, Berkshire	Lady Elizabeth Marvyn	1581	Around the middle of Lent	Local parishioners	Bread and towels
Tichborne Dole	Tichborne, Hampshire	Lady Mabella Tichborne (traditionally)	12th/13th century	Lady Day	Local poor	Flour
Biddenden Dole	Biddenden, Kent	The Biddenden Maids (traditional attribution)	c. 1775 (documented)	Easter Monday	Local poor and residents	Bread, cheese, cakes, biscuits
Andrew's Dole	Bideford, Devon	John Andrew	1605	New Year's Day	Poor residents of Bideford	Bread and money
