= Andrew's Dole =

Andrew's Dole is an English dole dating from 1605. In that year, the Mayor of Bideford (in the county of Devon), John Andrew, established a trust to provide for loaves of bread to be distributed to poor, elderly, persons who applied at the Mayor's Parlour. The custom continues to this day and takes place on New Year's Day. He also left some land to trustees and the income is distributed to 10 deserving people, for each trustee. Again this is distributed on New Year's Day.
