= Listed buildings in Biddenden =

Civil Parish in Kent, England

Biddenden is a village and civil parish in the Borough of Ashford of Kent, England. It contains three grade I, eight grade II* and 104 grade II listed buildings that are recorded in the National Heritage List for England.

This list is based on the information retrieved online from Historic England.

== Key ==
Grade	Criteria
I	Buildings that are of exceptional interest
II*	Particularly important buildings of more than special interest
II	Buildings that are of special interest

== Listing ==
Name	Grade	Location	Type	Completed (Note: The date given is the date used by Historic England as significant for the initial building or that of an important part in the structure's description.)	Date designated	Grid ref. (Note: The grid reference is based on the British national grid reference system, sometimes known as OSGB36, used by the Ordnance Survey.) Geo-coordinates	Notes	Entry number (Note: The "List Entry Number" is a unique number assigned to each listed building and scheduled monument by Historic England.)	Image	Wikidata
3-17 High Street	I	3-17 High Street			4 June 1952	TQ8506538392; 51°06′54″N 0°38′34″E		1184943	3-17 High Street More images	Q17529334
Barn to South East of Lashenden	II				9 August 1979	TQ8474140887; 51°08′15″N 0°38′22″E		1071008	Upload Photo	Q26325732
Bettmans Wood Farmhouse	II				9 August 1979	TQ8303539395; 51°07′29″N 0°36′51″E		1071001	Upload Photo	Q26325718
Birchley East Birchley Farmhouse Birchley West	II*				16 August 1962	TQ8452537196; 51°06′16″N 0°38′04″E		1071005	Birchley East Birchley Farmhouse Birchley West More images	Q17556097
Castwisell Manor Farmhouse	II*				4 June 1952	TQ8348337466; 51°06′26″N 0°37′11″E		1184788	Upload Photo	Q17556359
Iraden	II				9 August 1979	TQ8350439840; 51°07′42″N 0°37′16″E		1071002	Upload Photo	Q26325720
Lashenden	II				16 August 1962	TQ8472140888; 51°08′15″N 0°38′21″E		1299921	Upload Photo	Q26587271
Lichen	II				9 August 1979	TQ8501236219; 51°05′44″N 0°38′27″E		1184848	Upload Photo	Q26480160
Little Crampton Farmhouse	II				9 August 1979	TQ8788037843; 51°06′33″N 0°40′57″E		1071006	Upload Photo	Q26325726
Little Hare Plain	II				9 August 1979	TQ8301039597; 51°07′35″N 0°36′50″E		1184786	Upload Photo	Q26480107
Low Poles	II				9 August 1979	TQ8429437474; 51°06′25″N 0°37′52″E		1071004	Upload Photo	Q26325725
Medhurst	II				16 August 1962	TQ8430637004; 51°06′10″N 0°37′52″E		1184820	Upload Photo	Q26480136
Oasthouse at Bettmans Wood Farm to South West of Farmhouse	II				9 August 1979	TQ8299739363; 51°07′28″N 0°36′49″E		1299986	Upload Photo	Q26587330
Oasthouse at Ibornden Farm	II				9 August 1979	TQ8430940667; 51°08′08″N 0°37′59″E		1071003	Upload Photo	Q26325722
River Hall	II				9 August 1979	TQ8637838992; 51°07′12″N 0°39′42″E		1184829	Upload Photo	Q26480145
River Hall Farmhouse	II				9 August 1979	TQ8645138830; 51°07′06″N 0°39′46″E		1071007	Upload Photo	Q26325729
Weavers Cot	II*	Cot Lane			9 August 1979	TQ8556139355; 51°07′24″N 0°39′01″E		1071009	Upload Photo	Q17556099
New House Farmhouse	II	Cradducks Lane			9 August 1979	TQ8555436155; 51°05′41″N 0°38′55″E		1299929	Upload Photo	Q26587278
Bargate Farmhouse	II	Cranbrook Road			9 August 1979	TQ8404736631; 51°05′58″N 0°37′38″E		1362869	Upload Photo	Q26644732
Birchwood Farmhouse	II	Cranbrook Road			9 August 1979	TQ8425136366; 51°05′49″N 0°37′48″E		1071010	Upload Photo	Q26325735
Crosswell Farmhouse	II	Cranbrook Road			9 August 1979	TQ8394136636; 51°05′58″N 0°37′33″E		1362870	Upload Photo	Q26644733
Elmstone	II	Cranbrook Road, Fosten Green			16 August 1962	TQ8346236595; 51°05′57″N 0°37′08″E		1362871	Upload Photo	Q26644734
Former Granary at Birchwood Farmhouse	II	Cranbrook Road			9 August 1979	TQ8424636424; 51°05′51″N 0°37′48″E		1299931	Upload Photo	Q26587279
Fosten Green Cottage	II	Cranbrook Road			9 August 1979	TQ8365936569; 51°05′56″N 0°37′18″E		1071011	Upload Photo	Q26325738
Hales Place	II	Cranbrook Road			23 August 2005	TQ8423136509; 51°05′54″N 0°37′47″E		1391367	Upload Photo	Q26670732
Park Farmhouse	II	Cranbrook Road, Fosten Green			9 August 1979	TQ8357136624; 51°05′58″N 0°37′14″E		1184877	Upload Photo	Q26480187
Yew Trees	II	Cranbrook Road, Fosten Green			9 August 1979	TQ8383036643; 51°05′59″N 0°37′27″E		1299933	Upload Photo	Q26587281
Barn and Oast House at Washenden Manor to East of House	II	Dashmonden Road			9 August 1979	TQ8642338288; 51°06′49″N 0°39′43″E		1184923	Upload Photo	Q26480233
Large Barn at Washenden Manor to South East of House	II	Dashmonden Road			9 August 1979	TQ8639338255; 51°06′48″N 0°39′42″E		1071013	Upload Photo	Q26325742
Washenden Manor	II	Dashmonden Road			9 August 1979	TQ8636138306; 51°06′49″N 0°39′40″E		1299912	Upload Photo	Q26587263
Whitfield	II	Dashmonden Road			9 August 1979	TQ8570338322; 51°06′51″N 0°39′06″E		1071012	Upload Photo	Q26325740
Common Farmhouse	II	Hare Plain			16 August 1962	TQ8309039472; 51°07′31″N 0°36′54″E		1362868	Upload Photo	Q26644731
Hareplain Farmhouse	II	Hare Plain			16 August 1962	TQ8338239686; 51°07′38″N 0°37′10″E		1299989	Upload Photo	Q26587333
1 and 3, Headcorn Road	II	1 and 3, Headcorn Road			9 August 1979	TQ8535039263; 51°07′22″N 0°38′50″E		1362872	Upload Photo	Q26644735
2 and 4, Headcorn Road	II	2 and 4, Headcorn Road			16 August 1962	TQ8536139169; 51°07′19″N 0°38′50″E		1071014	Upload Photo	Q26325745
Newcastle Farmhouse	II	Headcorn Road			9 August 1979	TQ8528539751; 51°07′37″N 0°38′47″E		1362873	Upload Photo	Q26644736
Old Curteis	II	27, Headcorn Road			4 June 1952	TQ8537339480; 51°07′29″N 0°38′51″E		1184939	Upload Photo	Q26480250
18-26, High Street	II	18-26, High Street			4 June 1952	TQ8505838421; 51°06′55″N 0°38′33″E		1362892	Upload Photo	Q26644753
19 and 21, High Street	II	19 and 21, High Street			4 June 1952	TQ8502938395; 51°06′54″N 0°38′32″E		1071015	Upload Photo	Q26325747
2 and 4, High Street	II	2 and 4, High Street			9 August 1979	TQ8511238408; 51°06′54″N 0°38′36″E		1071016	Upload Photo	Q26325749
23 and 25, High Street	II	23 and 25, High Street			4 June 1952	TQ8500438403; 51°06′54″N 0°38′31″E		1184983	Upload Photo	Q26480292
32, High Street	II	32, High Street			16 August 1962	TQ8501638427; 51°06′55″N 0°38′31″E		1362893	Upload Photo	Q26644754
6-12, High Street	II	6-12, High Street			4 June 1952	TQ8509738410; 51°06′54″N 0°38′35″E		1184988	Upload Photo	Q26480297
Biddenden Post Office	II	16, High Street			4 June 1952	TQ8507538419; 51°06′55″N 0°38′34″E		1070974	Upload Photo	Q26325662
Church Cottages	II	3 and 4, High Street			9 August 1979	TQ8494938385; 51°06′54″N 0°38′28″E		1070977	Upload Photo	Q26325667
Church Cottages	II	1 and 2, High Street			9 August 1979	TQ8495538396; 51°06′54″N 0°38′28″E		1362894	Upload Photo	Q26686932
Old Kent House	II	High Street			19 December 1975	TQ8494338487; 51°06′57″N 0°38′28″E		1070976	Upload Photo	Q26325665
Parish Church of All Saints	I	High Street			16 August 1962	TQ8490938408; 51°06′54″N 0°38′26″E		1070978	Parish Church of All Saints More images	Q17529247
The Red Lion Inn	II	14, High Street			4 June 1952	TQ8508538419; 51°06′55″N 0°38′35″E		1362874	The Red Lion Inn More images	Q26644737
West House	II	28, High Street			4 June 1952	TQ8504138423; 51°06′55″N 0°38′32″E		1070975	Upload Photo	Q7774275
Kent Barn at Ibornden Farm	II	Ibornden			6 September 1993	TQ8426040629; 51°08′07″N 0°37′56″E		1216918	Upload Photo	Q26511669
Barn at West Ongley Farmhouse	II	Ilomden Road, Ibornden			9 August 1979	TQ8380639003; 51°07′15″N 0°37′30″E		1070979	Upload Photo	Q26325670
West Ongley Farmhouse	II	Ilomden Road, Ibornden			9 August 1979	TQ8384939042; 51°07′16″N 0°37′32″E		1362895	Upload Photo	Q26644756
Mockbeggar	II	Mockbeggar Lane			9 August 1979	TQ8316636168; 51°05′44″N 0°36′52″E		1185100	Upload Photo	Q26480407
2, North Street	II	2, North Street			9 August 1979	TQ8513938363; 51°06′53″N 0°38′37″E		1362896	Upload Photo	Q26644757
4, North Street	II	4, North Street			9 August 1979	TQ8514238382; 51°06′53″N 0°38′38″E		1185106	Upload Photo	Q26480416
41, North Street	II	41, North Street			9 August 1979	TQ8510738832; 51°07′08″N 0°38′37″E		1070985	Upload Photo	Q26325681
6 and 8, North Street	II	6 and 8, North Street			9 August 1979	TQ8514738396; 51°06′54″N 0°38′38″E		1070980	Upload Photo	Q26325672
66 and 68, North Street	II	66 and 68, North Street			16 August 1962	TQ8516438680; 51°07′03″N 0°38′39″E		1070981	Upload Photo	Q26325674
Barn and Oasthouse Adjoining No 53 to the North	II	North Street			9 August 1979	TQ8520439009; 51°07′14″N 0°38′42″E		1070986	Upload Photo	Q26325684
Garden Wall and Gate to the Old Cloth Workers Hall	II	North Street			9 August 1979	TQ8513738499; 51°06′57″N 0°38′38″E		1070983	Upload Photo	Q26325677
Lilac House	II	27, North Street			16 August 1962	TQ8512438675; 51°07′03″N 0°38′37″E		1070984	Upload Photo	Q26325679
Mansion House	II	29, North Street			16 August 1962	TQ8510638705; 51°07′04″N 0°38′36″E		1299819	Upload Photo	Q26587179
The Former Stables to the Cloth Workers' Hall Situated to the South of Cloth Workers' Hall	II	11, North Street			16 August 1962	TQ8510438479; 51°06′57″N 0°38′36″E		1185134	Upload Photo	Q26480448
The Laurels	II	70, North Street			16 August 1962	TQ8515538694; 51°07′03″N 0°38′39″E		1185113	Upload Photo	Q26480424
The Willows	II	53, North Street			9 August 1979	TQ8518238982; 51°07′13″N 0°38′41″E		1185153	Upload Photo	Q26480467
Townland Farmhouse	II	32, North Street			16 August 1962	TQ8517638558; 51°06′59″N 0°38′40″E		1185110	Upload Photo	Q26480420
Great Omenden Farmhouse	II	Omenden Area			9 August 1979	TQ8734940268; 51°07′52″N 0°40′34″E		1070987	Upload Photo	Q26325685
Little Omenden Farmhouse	II	Omenden Area			9 August 1979	TQ8704339766; 51°07′36″N 0°40′18″E		1185165	Upload Photo	Q26480477
Barn at Frogshole Farmhouse	II	Sissinghurst Road			9 August 1979	TQ8258738362; 51°06′56″N 0°36′26″E		1185299	Upload Photo	Q26480614
Frogshole Farmhouse	II	Sissinghurst Road			16 August 1962	TQ8266438415; 51°06′57″N 0°36′30″E		1362898	Upload Photo	Q26644759
Great Bachelors Hall	II*	Sissinghurst Road			4 June 1952	TQ8326638496; 51°06′59″N 0°37′01″E		1070991	Upload Photo	Q17556090
Hammermill Farmhouse	II	Sissinghurst Road			16 August 1962	TQ8202138232; 51°06′52″N 0°35′57″E		1070988	Upload Photo	Q26325688
Holden Farmhouse	II	Sissinghurst Road, Three Chimneys			9 August 1979	TQ8278238656; 51°07′05″N 0°36′37″E		1185288	Upload Photo	Q26480601
Newhouse Farmhouse	II	Sissinghurst Road			9 August 1979	TQ8454238375; 51°06′54″N 0°38′07″E		1185315	Upload Photo	Q26480632
Oasthouses at Frogshole Farm	II	Sissinghurst Road			9 August 1979	TQ8262538391; 51°06′57″N 0°36′28″E		1070990	Upload Photo	Q26325692
Pell House	II	Sissinghurst Road			22 December 1994	TQ8442138397; 51°06′55″N 0°38′01″E		1216956	Upload Photo	Q26511706
Tanner Farmhouse	II	Sissinghurst Road			9 August 1979	TQ8293938554; 51°07′01″N 0°36′45″E		1185302	Upload Photo	Q26480617
Thatcher's Cottage	II	Sissinghurst Road			9 August 1979	TQ8267238579; 51°07′03″N 0°36′31″E		1185264	Upload Photo	Q26480578
The Water Mill Building at Hammermill Farm	II	Sissinghurst Road			9 August 1979	TQ8200538220; 51°06′52″N 0°35′56″E		1362897	Upload Photo	Q26644758
The White House	II	1 and 2, Sissinghurst Road			16 August 1962	TQ8461038328; 51°06′52″N 0°38′10″E		1185179	Upload Photo	Q26480489
Three Chimney Cottages	II	1, 2 and 3, Sissinghurst Road			9 August 1979	TQ8267738606; 51°07′03″N 0°36′31″E		1070989	Upload Photo	Q26325690
Elizabeth Farmhouse	II	Smarden Road, Monk's Hill			16 August 1962	TQ8655241006; 51°08′17″N 0°39′55″E		1362900	Upload Photo	Q26644760
Forstal Farmhouse	II	Smarden Road			16 August 1962	TQ8565439880; 51°07′41″N 0°39′07″E		1070992	Upload Photo	Q26325695
Monkshill Cottages	II	1-4, Smarden Road			9 August 1979	TQ8624840840; 51°08′12″N 0°39′39″E		1299702	Upload Photo	Q26587075
Vane Court	II*	Smarden Road			9 August 1979	TQ8588740472; 51°08′00″N 0°39′20″E		1362899	Vane Court More images	Q17556938
Little Dane	II	Standen Area			9 August 1979	TQ8567040086; 51°07′48″N 0°39′08″E		1362901	Upload Photo	Q26644761
Little Standen	II	Standen Area			9 August 1979	TQ8579140337; 51°07′56″N 0°39′15″E		1070994	Upload Photo	Q26325699
Little Standen Farmhouse	II	Standen Area			9 August 1979	TQ8576440325; 51°07′55″N 0°39′13″E		1299717	Upload Photo	Q26587087
Ponds Farmhouse	II	Standen Area			9 August 1979	TQ8520840237; 51°07′53″N 0°38′44″E		1185334	Upload Photo	Q26480651
Standen	II*	Standen Area			16 August 1962	TQ8559140056; 51°07′47″N 0°39′04″E		1185339	Upload Photo	Q17556386
Weeks Land Farmhouse	II	Standen Area			16 August 1962	TQ8538340208; 51°07′52″N 0°38′53″E		1070993	Upload Photo	Q26325697
Dullen's Farmhouse	II	Stede Quarter			9 August 1979	TQ8620338644; 51°07′01″N 0°39′33″E		1070995	Upload Photo	Q26325702
Island Farmhouse	II	Stede Quarter			4 June 1952	TQ8719338565; 51°06′57″N 0°40′23″E		1362902	Upload Photo	Q26644762
Stede Court	II	Stede Quarter			16 August 1962	TQ8715238504; 51°06′55″N 0°40′21″E		1070952	Upload Photo	Q26325610
Stede Court Farmhouse	II	Stede Quarter			9 August 1979	TQ8721638496; 51°06′55″N 0°40′24″E		1362921	Upload Photo	Q26644782
Stede Quarter Farmhouse	II	Stede Quarter			9 August 1979	TQ8677538497; 51°06′55″N 0°40′02″E		1299685	Upload Photo	Q26587059
Biddenden Place	II*	Tenterden Road			4 June 1952	TQ8515838301; 51°06′51″N 0°38′38″E		1299500	Biddenden Place More images	Q17556853
Dashmonden	II	Tenterden Road			9 August 1979	TQ8534737888; 51°06′37″N 0°38′47″E		1362922	Upload Photo	Q26644783
Duesden	II	Tenterden Road			9 August 1979	TQ8602837010; 51°06′08″N 0°39′21″E		1070954	Upload Photo	Q26325615
Field Cottage	II	Tenterden Road			16 August 1962	TQ8505838348; 51°06′52″N 0°38′33″E		1070955	Upload Photo	Q26325617
Goldwell Farmhouse	II	Tenterden Road			16 August 1962	TQ8620536428; 51°05′49″N 0°39′29″E		1362923	Upload Photo	Q26644784
Henden Hall	II*	Tenterden Road, TN27 8BB			4 June 1952	TQ8509238330; 51°06′52″N 0°38′35″E		1070956	Upload Photo	Q17556085
Little Randolph's Farmhouse	II	Tenterden Road			9 August 1979	TQ8523437720; 51°06′32″N 0°38′41″E		1070953	Upload Photo	Q26325613
Malt House	II	Tenterden Road			9 August 1979	TQ8507738137; 51°06′45″N 0°38′34″E		1362885	Upload Photo	Q26644747
Shorts Farmhouse	II	Tenterden Road, TN27 8DP			26 January 1971	TQ8519335258; 51°05′12″N 0°38′34″E		1184906	Upload Photo	Q26480216
The Garden Wall and Gazebo of Henden Hall	II	Tenterden Road			16 August 1962	TQ8511538272; 51°06′50″N 0°38′36″E		1362924	Upload Photo	Q26644785
Vine Cottages Vine House	II	Tenterden Road			16 August 1962	TQ8507038231; 51°06′49″N 0°38′34″E		1070957	Upload Photo	Q26325620
East Wing and West Wing	I	The Old Cloth Hall, North Street, TN27 8AG			4 June 1952	TQ8511138503; 51°06′57″N 0°38′36″E		1070982	Upload Photo	Q17529252
Blackfriars	II	Worsenden Green			16 August 1962	TQ8409638365; 51°06′54″N 0°37′44″E		1070959	Upload Photo	Q26325625
Former Granary and Stable at South West Corner of Worsenden	II	Worsenden Green			9 August 1979	TQ8421838027; 51°06′43″N 0°37′49″E		1070961	Upload Photo	Q26325631
Nimrod Hall	II	Worsenden Green			16 August 1962	TQ8384738372; 51°06′55″N 0°37′31″E		1185871	Upload Photo	Q26481163
Randolph's Farmhouse	II	Worsenden Green			16 August 1962	TQ8378838356; 51°06′54″N 0°37′28″E		1070958	Upload Photo	Q26325622
Worsenden	II	Worsenden Green			9 August 1979	TQ8421838043; 51°06′43″N 0°37′49″E		1185878	Upload Photo	Q26481171
Worsenden Green Cottage	II	Worsenden Green			9 August 1979	TQ8423238044; 51°06′43″N 0°37′50″E		1070960	Upload Photo	Q26325627

== See also ==
- Grade I listed buildings in Kent
- Grade II* listed buildings in Kent

== Sources ==
- Newman, John (2012) [1969], Kent: West and the Weald, The Buildings of England, New Haven and London: Yale University Press, ISBN 978-0-300-18509-6
