= Biddenden =

Village in Kent, England

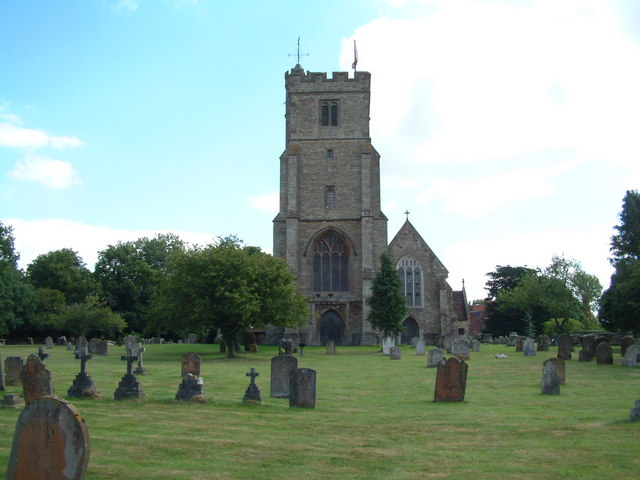
- All Saints Biddenden Church

- Location within Kent
- Area: 29.12 km^{2} (11.24 sq mi)
- Population: 2,700 (Civil Parish 2022)
  - Density: 93/km^{2} (240/sq mi)
- OS grid reference: TQ850383
- Civil parish: Biddenden
- District: Ashford
- Shire county: Kent
- Region: South East
- Country: England
- Sovereign state: United Kingdom
- Post town: ASHFORD
- Postcode district: TN27
- Dialling code: 01580
- Police: Kent
- Fire: Kent
- Ambulance: South East Coast
- UK Parliament: Weald of Kent

Biddenden is a large, mostly agricultural and wooded village and civil parish in the borough of Ashford in Kent, England. The village lies on the Weald of Kent, 5 miles (8 km) north of Tenterden. It was a centre for the Wealden iron industry and clothmaking.

The parish includes the hamlet Woolpack Corner (51.10°N 00.64°E).

== Origin of name ==
The place name Biddenden is derived from the Kentish dialect of Old English, meaning "Bidda's woodland pasture". It is associated with a man called Bida, and was originally Biddingden (c993) Bida + ing + denn, eventually evolving into the current spelling.

== History ==
All Saints Biddenden is the parish church, built mostly in the 13th century. There was likely an earlier Saxon church here. During the half-century reign of Edward III, Flemish clothworkers were settled in the area. The ready availability of raw materials led to the establishment of a flourishing textile industry for the production of broadcloth. Wealth from this industry built many of the fine houses in town.

Biddenden Place was the ancestral home of the Mayney or Mayne family: the village school, originally founded in 1522, is named after its benefactor John Mayne.

== Biddenden Maids ==
In 1100, Mary and Eliza Chulkhurst, collectively known as the Biddenden Maids, were a pair of conjoined twins supposedly born in the village. The origin of the perpetual charity of Biddenden is celebrated in the village signage of the Biddenden Maids, as they became known. The Biddenden Consolidated Charity provides Biddenden pensioners and widows with bread, cheese, and tea at Easter, a cash payment at Christmas, and distribution of Biddenden cakes.

== Demography ==
Biddenden compared
2001 UK Census	Biddenden	Ashford district	England
Population	2,434	102,661	49,138,831
Foreign born	5.8%	5.5%	9.2%
White	98.7%	97.6%	90.9%
Asian	0.3%	0.9%	4.6%
Black	0.5%	0.4%	2.3%
Christian	78.6%	76.5%	71.7%
Muslim	0.1%	0.6%	3.1%
Hindu	0.2%	0.3%	1.1%
No religion	12.7%	14.6%	14.6%
Unemployed	1.7%	2.4%	3.3%
Retired	18.8%	13.8%	13.5%

At the 2021 UK census, the Biddenden electoral ward had a population of 2,700. The ethnicity was 96.6% white, 1.3% mixed race, 1.4% Asian, 0.3% black and 0.4% other. 85.4% held a UK passport, 2.8% held a non-UK passport, and 11.8% did not hold a passport. Religion was recorded as 53.6% Christian, 0.6% Buddhist, 0.3% Muslim, 0.1% Hindu, 0.1% Jewish, and 0.0% Sikh: 39.1% were recorded as having no religion, 0.7% had another religion and 5.5% did not state their religion.

The economic activity of residents aged 16 and over was 18.4% in full-time employment of 49 hours per week or more, 49.5% full-time 31-48 hours, 19.7% in part-time employment 16-30 hours, and 12.4% part-time 15 hours or less. 55.9% were economically active and in employment, 1.9% were economically active and unemployed, and 42.2% were economically inactive. The industry of employment of residents was 23.6% managers, directors and senior officials, 19.2% professional occupations, 12.0% associate professional and technical occupations, 9.1% administrative and secretarial occupations, 12.9% skilled trades and occupations, 6.6% caring, leisure and other service occupations, 4.5% sales and customer service, 4.4% process, plant and machine operatives, and 7.8& elementary occupations. Compared with national figures, the ward had a relatively high proportion of workers in managerial and directorial professions. Of the ward's residents aged 16–74, 19.6% had a higher education qualification or the equivalent, compared with 19.9% nationwide.

An important cottage industry has developed to the west, where numerous vineyards and orchards produce varietal wines, ciders and juices. Biddenden is also the trading name of Biddenden's Cider whose premises are close to the clustered village centre.

== Transport ==
Biddenden was served for nearly five decades by Biddenden railway station, on the Kent and East Sussex Railway. The station opened on 15 May 1905 and closed on 4 January 1954.

Bygone Buses was based in Biddenden during the late 1980s and early 1990s. It was sold to Maidstone & District Motor Services.

== Notable people ==
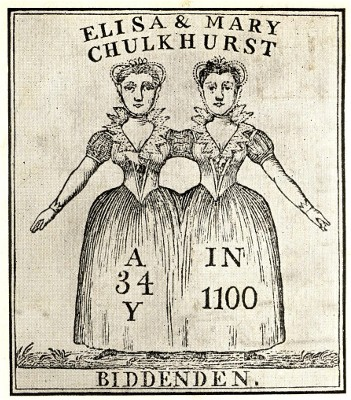
Mary and Eliza Chulkhurst, the Biddenden Maids

- Mary and Eliza Chulkhurst (1100–34), conjoined twins traditionally said to have lived in Biddenden.
- Thomas Bickley (1518–96), was rector of Biddenden prior to 1585.
- Elias Sydall (1672–1733), was rector of Biddenden 1702–05.
- Edward Nares (1762–1841), theologian, was rector of Biddenden 1798–1827.
- Robert Kahn (1865–1951), composer, lived in Biddenden from 1938–51.
- John R. Winder (1821–1910), Second in command of the Church of Jesus Christ of Latter-day Saints 1901–1910, was born in Biddenden.
- William Guy (1859–1950), pioneer of modern dentistry, was born in Biddenden.
- King Rama VII of Siam (1893–1941) lived at Vane Court in Biddenden after his abdication in 1935.
- Sir John Kotelawala (1895–1980), Prime Minister of Ceylon, lived in Biddenden for several years.

== See also ==
- Listed buildings in Biddenden
