= Grade I listed buildings in Ashford (borough) =

There are over 9,000 Grade I listed buildings in England. This page is a list of these buildings in the district of Ashford in Kent.

== List of buildings ==
Name	Location	Type	Completed (Note: The date given is the date used by Historic England as significant for the initial building or that of an important part in the structure's description.)	Date designated	Grid ref. (Note: The grid reference is based on the British national grid reference system, sometimes known as OSGB36, used by the Ordnance Survey.) Geo-coordinates	Entry number (Note: The "List Entry Number" is a unique number assigned to each listed building and scheduled monument by Historic England.)	Image
Church of St Martin	Aldington	Church	11th century (Saxo Norman)	10 August 1988	TR0749936183; 51°05′15″N 0°57′41″E	1071208	Church of St Martin More images
Church of St Peter and St Paul	Appledore	Church	13th century	16 August 1962	TQ9576429282; 51°01′46″N 0°47′25″E	1071031	Church of St Peter and St Paul More images
Parish Church of St Mary the Virgin	Ashford	Church	14th century	24 September 1951	TR0102042727; 51°08′55″N 0°52′22″E	1071114	Parish Church of St Mary the Virgin More images
Church of St Margaret	Bethersden	Church	14th century	14 February 1967	TQ9279240264; 51°07′45″N 0°45′14″E	1070794	Church of St Margaret More images
New Biddenden Stores/The Maydes Restaurant/Ye Ancient House	Biddenden	House	16th century or earlier	4 June 1952	TQ8506538392; 51°06′54″N 0°38′34″E	1184943	New Biddenden Stores/The Maydes Restaurant/Ye Ancient House More images
Old Cloth Workers Hall or The Old Cloth Hall	Biddenden	Manor house	15th century	4 June 1952	TQ8511138503; 51°06′57″N 0°38′36″E	1070982	Old Cloth Workers Hall or The Old Cloth Hall
Parish Church of All Saints	Biddenden	Church	Early 13th century	16 August 1962	TQ8490938408; 51°06′54″N 0°38′26″E	1070978	Parish Church of All Saints More images
St Augustines Priory (medieval buildings)	Bilsington	Monastic buildings	1536	13 October 1952	TR0434135525; 51°04′58″N 0°54′58″E	1362769	St Augustines Priory (medieval buildings) More images
Church of St Rumwold	Bonnington	Manor house	12th century	27 November 1957	TR0571534426; 51°04′20″N 0°56′06″E	1071194	Church of St Rumwold More images
Church of All Saints	Boughton Aluph	Church	13th century	27 November 1957	TR0332048144; 51°11′47″N 0°54′31″E	1299904	Church of All Saints More images
Church of St Mary	Brabourne	Church	Late 12th century	27 November 1957	TR1036041678; 51°08′09″N 1°00′20″E	1232793	Church of St Mary More images
Barn with sheds about 50 metres west of Court Lodge	Brook	Museum	Mid- to late 14th century	16 February 1989	TR0657544265; 51°09′37″N 0°57′11″E	1233070	Barn with sheds about 50 metres west of Court Lodge More images
Church of St Mary	Brook	Church	1096–1107	27 November 1957	TR0663544281; 51°09′38″N 0°57′14″E	1232974	Church of St Mary More images
Barn to south-east of Palace Farmhouse	Charing	Barn	1333–48	14 February 1967	TQ9543649426; 51°12′38″N 0°47′48″E	1185861	Barn to south-east of Palace Farmhouse More images
Church of St Peter and St Paul	Charing	Church	13th century	14 February 1967	TQ9544249383; 51°12′37″N 0°47′48″E	1362985	Church of St Peter and St Paul More images
Outhouse to west of Palace Farmhouse	Charing	Farm building	14th century	14 February 1967	TQ9537749441; 51°12′39″N 0°47′45″E	1186008	Upload Photo
Palace Cottages and the remains of the gatehouse adjoining	Charing	Archbishops palace	14th century	14 February 1967	TQ9539249412; 51°12′38″N 0°47′46″E	1070757	Palace Cottages and the remains of the gatehouse adjoining More images
Palace Farmhouse	Charing	Archbishops palace	13th century	14 February 1967	TQ9541649446; 51°12′39″N 0°47′47″E	1070756	Palace Farmhouse More images
Pett Place	Charing	House	16th century	17 September 1952	TQ9607649018; 51°12′24″N 0°48′20″E	1071539	Pett Place More images
Chilham Castle	Chilham	House	1616 on frieze inscription	13 October 1952	TR0668753479; 51°14′35″N 0°57′35″E	1071304	Chilham Castle More images
Chilham Castle Keep and donkey wheel	Chilham	Keep	11th century	13 October 1952	TR0663553463; 51°14′34″N 0°57′33″E	1185170	Chilham Castle Keep and donkey wheel More images
Church of St Mary	Chilham	Church	14th century	27 November 1957	TR0688553656; 51°14′40″N 0°57′46″E	1071308	Church of St Mary More images
Hurst Farmhouse	Chilham	Aisled house	14th century	27 November 1957	TR0665951824; 51°13′41″N 0°57′31″E	1071283	Hurst Farmhouse More images
Church of St Mary	Crundale	Church	12th century details	27 November 1957	TR0857748599; 51°11′55″N 0°59′03″E	1299607	Church of St Mary More images
Church of St James	Egerton	Church	14th century	14 February 1967	TQ9081547556; 51°11′43″N 0°43′46″E	1071496	Church of St James More images
Church of St Lawrence	Godmersham	Church	11th century	27 November 1957	TR0620450451; 51°12′58″N 0°57′04″E	1299528	Church of St Lawrence More images
Godmersham Park, courtyards, walled gardens and gateways	Godmersham Park	House	1732	13 October 1952	TR0615451018; 51°13′16″N 0°57′03″E	1071232	Godmersham Park, courtyards, walled gardens and gateways More images
Church of St Mary	Great Chart with Singleton	Church	13th century	14 February 1967	TQ9796441917; 51°08′32″N 0°49′43″E	1115757	Church of St Mary More images
Godinton	Godinton Park, Great Chart with Singleton	House	1628	17 September 1952	TQ9820343860; 51°09′35″N 0°49′59″E	1071511	Godinton More images
Church of St Mary	Hastingleigh	Church	11th century	16 February 1989	TR1019744495; 51°09′40″N 1°00′17″E	1232978	Church of St Mary More images
Parish Church of St Mary	High Halden	Church	Norman	16 August 1962	TQ9016337237; 51°06′10″N 0°42′53″E	1185888	Parish Church of St Mary More images
Church of St Margaret	Hothfield	Church	Late 16th or early 17th century	14 February 1967	TQ9696444528; 51°09′58″N 0°48′57″E	1115733	Church of St Margaret More images
Church of St Michael	Kingsnorth	Church	Largely 15th century	14 February 1967	TR0061339241; 51°07′02″N 0°51′54″E	1362667	Church of St Michael More images
Church of St John the Baptist	Mersham	Church	12th-century origin	27 November 1957	TR0526239374; 51°07′01″N 0°55′53″E	1276693	Church of St John the Baptist More images
Mersham Le Hatch	Mersham	Country house	1762–66	13 October 1952	TR0603240390; 51°07′33″N 0°56′35″E	1233748	Mersham Le Hatch More images
Mersham Manor	Mersham	House	Late 18th century	27 November 1957	TR0521439386; 51°07′01″N 0°55′51″E	1233281	Upload Photo
Church of St Peter	Molash	Church	13th century	27 November 1957	TR0238352176; 51°13′58″N 0°53′51″E	1185844	Church of St Peter More images
Church of St Nicholas, Pluckley	Pluckley	Church	14th century	14 February 1967	TQ9266945351; 51°10′30″N 0°45′18″E	1362688	Church of St Nicholas, Pluckley More images
Parish Church of St Mary	Rolvenden	Church	13th century	16 August 1962	TQ8450931219; 51°03′02″N 0°37′52″E	1116287	Parish Church of St Mary More images
Church of St Mary Magdalene	Ruckinge	Church	12th century	27 November 1957	TR0247433535; 51°03′56″N 0°53′18″E	1185079	Church of St Mary Magdalene More images
Church of St Mary	Sevington	Church	12th century	27 November 1957	TR0370540875; 51°07′51″N 0°54′36″E	1233902	Church of St Mary More images
Church of St Michael	Smarden	Church	14th century	14 February 1967	TQ8797742293; 51°08′56″N 0°41′11″E	1071358	Church of St Michael More images
Church of St Mary	Smeeth	Church	11th century	27 November 1957	TR0722539614; 51°07′06″N 0°57′34″E	1071165	Church of St Mary More images
Parish Church of St Mildred	Tenterden	Church	1467	8 May 1950	TQ8836833372; 51°04′08″N 0°41′14″E	1355024	Parish Church of St Mildred More images
Church of St Matthew	Warehorne	Church	13th century	27 November 1957	TQ9898832512; 51°03′27″N 0°50′17″E	1071183	Church of St Matthew More images
Church of St Mary	Westwell	Church	13th century	14 February 1967	TQ9906247483; 51°11′31″N 0°50′51″E	1068690	Church of St Mary More images
Parish Church of St John the Baptist	Wittersham	Church	14th century	16 August 1962	TQ8975026965; 51°00′39″N 0°42′13″E	1070852	Parish Church of St John the Baptist More images
Parish Church of All Saints	Woodchurch	Church	13th century	16 August 1962	TQ9419334916; 51°04′50″N 0°46′16″E	1362956	Parish Church of All Saints More images
Church of Saint Gregory and Saint Martin	Wye	Church	13th century	27 November 1957	TR0540846904; 51°11′04″N 0°56′16″E	1217135	Church of Saint Gregory and Saint Martin More images
Church of St Mary	Hinxhill, Wye with Hinxhill	Church	13th century	27 November 1957	TR0486142619; 51°08′46″N 0°55′39″E	1275459	Church of St Mary More images
The Latin School Wye College	Wyre	Grammar school	c.1445	13 October 1952	TR0546446834; 51°11′02″N 0°56′19″E	1217080	The Latin School Wye College More images
Wye College, Cloister Quadrangle	Wye	Teachers house	1739	13 October 1952	TR0549046858; 51°11′02″N 0°56′20″E	1275610	Wye College, Cloister Quadrangle More images

== See also ==
Grade II* listed buildings in Ashford (borough)
