= Scawen =

Scawen is a surname. Notable people with the surname include:

- James Scawen (1734–1801), English politician
- Robert Scawen (1602–1670), English politician
- William Scawen (1600–1689), English politician

Woods-Scawen

- Anthony Woods-Scawen DFC (1918–1940)
- Patrick Woods-Scawen DFC (1916–1940)
