= Snave =

Village in Kent, England

Coordinates: 51.034°N 0.8695°E

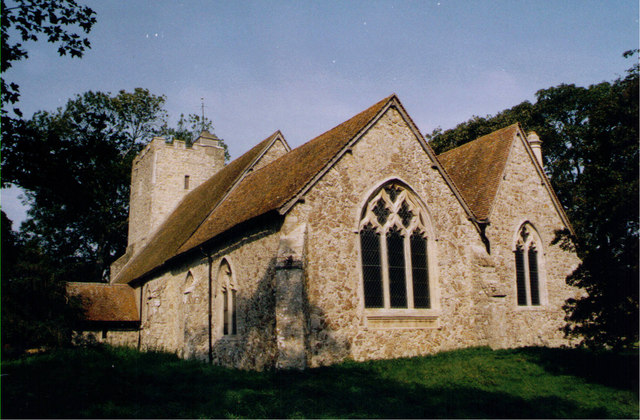
- Church of St Augustine

- Location within Kent
- Civil parish: Brenzett
- District: Folkestone and Hythe
- Shire county: Kent
- Region: South East
- Country: England
- Sovereign state: United Kingdom
- Post town: Ashford
- Postcode district: TN26
- Police: Kent
- Fire: Kent
- Ambulance: South East Coast
- UK Parliament: Ashford

Snave is a village and former civil parish, now in the parish of Brenzett, in the Folkestone and Hythe district, in the county of Kent, England. It is on Romney Marsh in Kent, England centred close to the A2070 road 8 miles (13 km) south of Ashford. Its buildings are a few houses, barns and store sheds and the church of St Augustine which holds one service per year at harvest festival. In spring, the churchyard is heavily clad in daffodils. The church falls under the ecclesiastical parish of Orlestone with Snave, in the Diocese of Canterbury. In 1931 the parish had a population of 70.

The nearest shops and railway station are at Hamstreet (3 miles) save for a petrol station at Brenzett (2 miles).

Animals have long been part of the economy. Sheep tending and wool manufacture is a major part of the history of Romney Marsh. Veterinary practices and a boarding cattery are among the local businesses.

== History ==
The name "Snave" means 'Spit of land'. On 1 April 1934 the parish was abolished and merged with Brenzett and Ivychurch.
