= Bonnington =

Village in Kent, England

Coordinates: 51°04′49″N 0°55′56″E

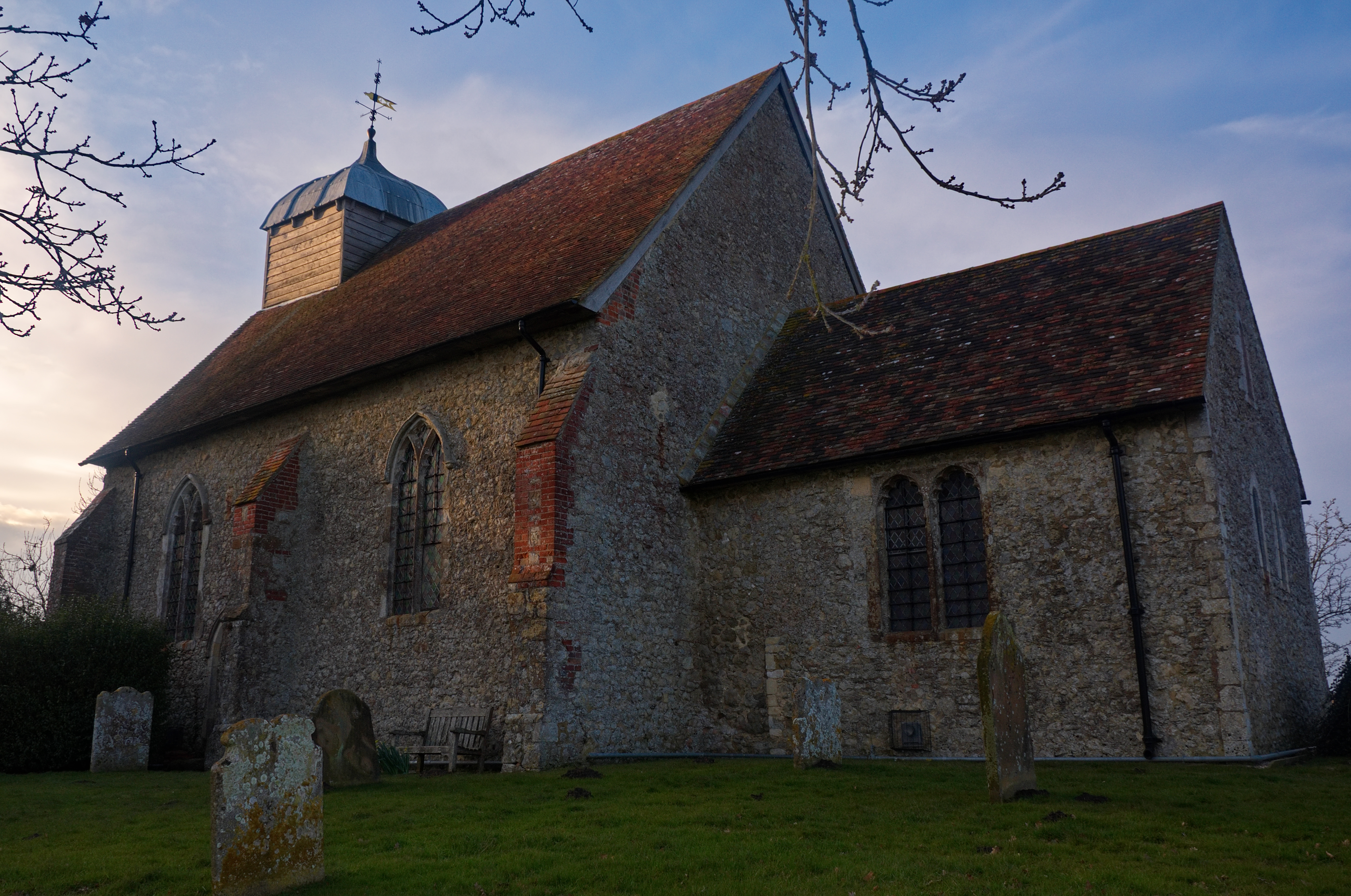
- St Rumwold's Church, a Grade I listed church

- Location within Kent
- Population: 109 (2001)
- OS grid reference: TR057352
- Civil parish: Bonnington
- District: Ashford
- Shire county: Kent
- Region: South East
- Country: England
- Sovereign state: United Kingdom
- Post town: ASHFORD
- Postcode district: TN25
- Dialling code: 01233
- Police: Kent
- Fire: Kent
- Ambulance: South East Coast
- UK Parliament: Ashford

Bonnington is a dispersed village and civil parish on the northern edge of the Romney Marsh in Ashford District of Kent, England. The village is located eight miles (13 km) to the south of the town of Ashford on the B2067 (Hamstreet to Hythe road).

Bonnington has under 100 inhabitants and has historic connections with smuggling. The parish used to boast its own school at the T-junction with the former B2069, and a public house (The Oak) located nearly two miles southeast of the village. The parish church, dedicated to St Rumwold, the child saint, is about half a mile to the south of the hamlet, on the Royal Military Canal.

The parish council is now linked with the larger village of Aldington (where the population is now included) which is where the nearest shops can be found.

== Location and landscape ==
The small parish of Bonnington in the English county of Kent lies between the town of Ashford to the west (5 mi or 8 km) and the coastal town of Hythe to the east (6 mi or 10 km). To the north, the parish is bordered by the parish of Aldington, to the west, it borders the parish of Bilsington and to the south, the parish stretches into the low-lying coastal region of Romney Marsh. The parish covers an area of around 1,200 acres (490 ha), of which about 40% forms part of Romney Marsh.

In landscape terms, the parish of Bonnington has much in common with its neighbour Aldington. Thus, parts of the parish are designated, and protected, as an Area of Outstanding Natural Beauty, and parts are designated, and protected, as forming part of the Old Romney Shoreline Special Landscape Area.

A particularly striking feature of Bonnington's landscape is the low elevation above sea level of much of the land to the north of the Royal Military Canal – on average only 10 ft (3 m) to 100 ft (31 m) above sea level. This very low-lying area once lay directly on the English Channel, and the Royal Military Canal, which separates the low-lying area from the even lower Romney Marsh, marks the English Channel's former shoreline.

There has never been a village of Bonnington, and thus the parish has no obvious centre. The description of "scattered" given to Bonnington by Ford Madox Ford in the 19th century is still apt today.

== People ==
The parish of Bonnington is home to about 100 people living in around 45 houses. Only a small percentage of the parish's population is under 80 years of age. The population is widely scattered but mainly related, with clusters around the village green and the picturesque Cherry Orchard Lane.

The writer Ford Madox Ford lived at Bloomfield Villa (now Fir Trees Villa) from 1894 for two years. He described some of the local characters in his books and recalled the village in Return to Yesterday, which was published in 1932.

"Bonnington was in a scattered, little-populated village of the South of England. The village stood on what had formerly been common land; running all down the side of a range of hills. But this common land had been long since squatted on, so that it was a maze of little hawthorn hedges surrounding little closes."

== Industry and commerce ==
As in Aldington, agriculture is the only significant indigenous economic activities, albeit an insignificant source of employment. However, the predominance of agriculture in Bonnington is more noticeable than in Aldington parish because of the absence of any village centre and the absence of any infrastructure provided by shops, schools, pubs or post office. As with Aldington, the majority of Bonnington parishioners work in nearby towns or in London.

== Facilities ==
The parish's facilities include a mobile library, a public relief centre, a drift field and St Rumwold's, a Grade I listed Church of England parish church.

== History ==
Although Bonnington is mentioned in the 11th-century Domesday Book, little is known of its early history, other than the fact that for several centuries it was owned by the Knights Hospitaller. In the 19th century, smuggling was a significant activity in Bonnington, but this declined rapidly with the capture of the infamous Ransley Gang.

From at least the time of Queen Elizabeth I of England, if not before, an old oak tree known as the Law-Day Oak, has played a significant role in the governance of Bonnington parish. In earlier times, the Law-Day Oak provided the setting for Courts held to hear local pleas, and to this day the Bonnington Annual Parish Meeting is held under the branches of this ancient oak.

In 1889 a Mrs White wrote in a learned journal thus about the Law-Day Oak:

"In the out-of-the-way villages on the borders of Romney marsh, the former home of shepherds and smugglers, the light of civilisation has not long shone, and many rites and superstitions connected with the worship of the oak are still persisted in by the inhabitants. A special sacredness appertains to the vows of lovers exchanged beneath the Bonnington oak, and its leaves, gathered with a certain formula at a certain time of night, are still sought by childless women and made into a medicinal draught, with the same intention as in Druidical days."

== See also ==
- Listed buildings in Bonnington
