= RAF Brenzett =

Former RAF station in Kent, England

RAF Brenzett
- Near Brenzett, Kent in England

Site information
- Type: RAF Advanced landing ground
- Code: ZT
- Owner: Air Ministry
- Operator: Royal Air Force
- Controlled by: Second Tactical Air Force * No. 84 Group RAF; RAF Fighter Command * No. 11 Group RAF

Location
- Shown within Kent RAF Brenzett (the United Kingdom)
- Coordinates: 51°00′52″N 000°52′45″E

Site history
- Built: 1943
- Built by: RAF Airfield Construction Service
- In use: March 1943–1944
- Battles/wars: European theatre of World War II

Airfield information
- Elevation: 9 feet (3 m) AMSL
Runways
Direction	Length and surface
00/00	Sommerfeld Tracking
00/00	Sommerfeld Tracking

Royal Air Force Brenzett or more simply RAF Brenzett is a former Royal Air Force Advanced landing ground close to the village of Brenzett near Romney Marsh, Kent during the Second World War. It was used as an airfield in 1944 for the Mustang Wing which comprised three squadrons including two Polish squadrons in exile and operated patrols against V-1 flying bombs.

== History ==
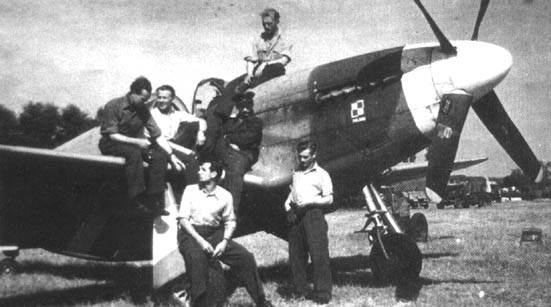
Polish airmen at RAF Brenzett during the Second World War

The site was chosen for an Advanced landing ground in July 1942 and construction work on the 300-acre (1.2 km^{2}) site of flat marshland commenced in 1943, it was due to open on 1 March 1943 but was not ready for occupation until September and the airfield opened as RAF Brenzett as part of RAF Fighter Command on 14 September 1943 with two Sommerfeld Tracking runways. The locals referred to the airfield as Ivychurch after the nearest village. The airfield eventually had five blister hangars for the aircraft but most of the personnel were housed in a tented camp.

The first unit to use the airfield was No. 122 Squadron RAF with Supermarine Spitfires in August 1943 who used it relieve pressure on their home airfield of RAF Kingsnorth five miles (8 km) to the north. The airfield was not used to support the D-Day landings but in July 1944 No. 133 Wing RAF, with Polish-flown North American Mustangs, three squadrons strong, was based there, mainly on anti-flying bomb patrols.

The United States Army Air Corps designated the airfield Station Number 438. The main American unit was Battery C, 635 AAA (Anti-aircraft Artillery), Automatic Weapons Bn, IX Air Defence Command.

The Mustang wing left in October 1944 and the airfield was no longer needed, and closed on 13 December 1944, returning to agricultural use. In 1972 the Brenzett Aeronautical Museum, a military and aviation museum, was opened near the site in buildings formerly occupied by the Women's Land Army.

== Units and aircraft ==
Unit	Dates	Aircraft	Notes
No. 122 (Bombay) Squadron RAF	1943	Supermarine Spitfire IX	Detachments from RAF Kingsnorth
No. 129 (Mysore) Squadron RAF	1944	North American Mustang III	Part of No. 133 Wing RAF
No. 306 Polish Fighter Squadron	1944	North American Mustang III	Part of No. 133 Wing RAF
No. 315 Polish Fighter Squadron	1944	North American Mustang III	Part of No. 133 Wing RAF
