= Brenzett =

Village in Kent, England

Coordinates: 51.01°N 0.854°E

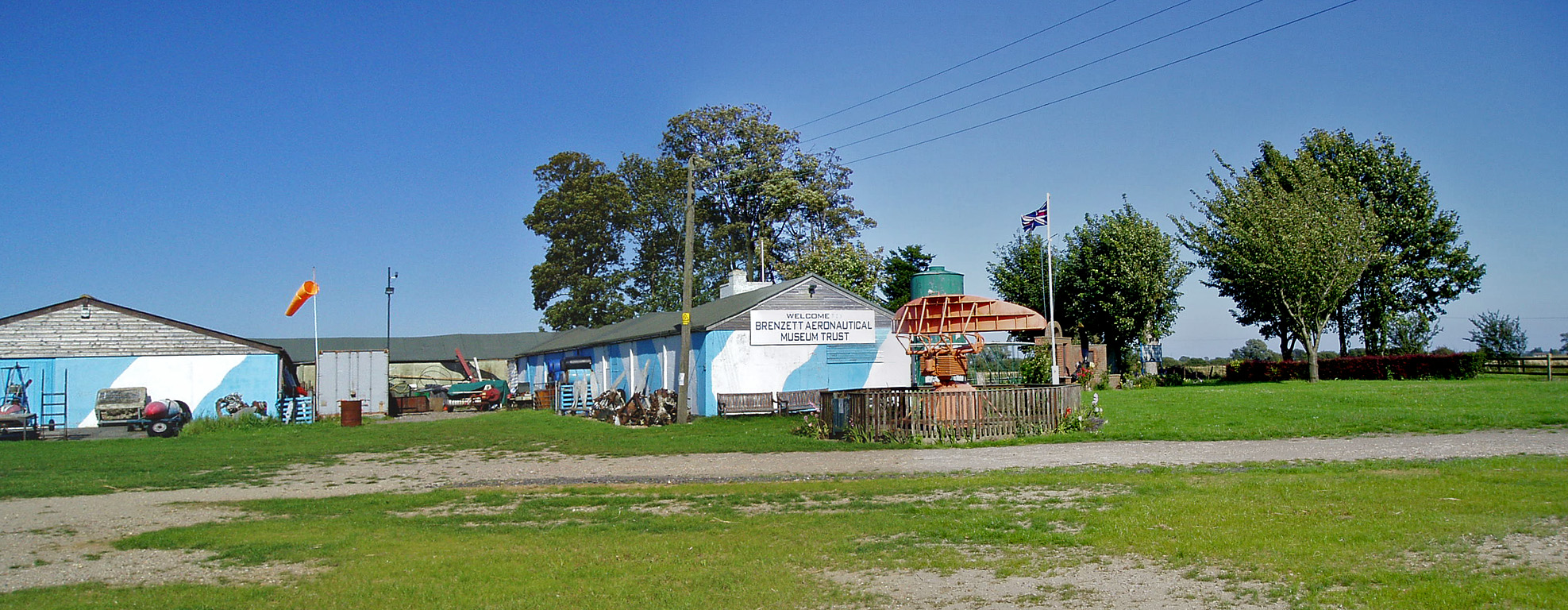
- Brenzett Aeronautical Museum

- Location within Kent
- Population: 379 (2011)
- OS grid reference: TR003273
- District: Folkestone and Hythe
- Shire county: Kent
- Region: South East
- Country: England
- Sovereign state: United Kingdom
- Post town: Romney Marsh
- Postcode district: TN29
- Police: Kent
- Fire: Kent
- Ambulance: South East Coast
- UK Parliament: Folkestone and Hythe

Brenzett (/ˈbrɛnzɪt/ BREN-zit) is a village and civil parish in the Folkestone and Hythe District of Kent, England. The village lies on the Romney Marsh, three miles (4.8 km) west of New Romney. The population of the civil parish includes the hamlet of Snave.

The place-name 'Brenzett' is first attested in the Domesday Book of 1086, where it appears as Brensete. The name is thought to mean 'burnt house' in Old English.

It is the home to the Romney Marsh Wartime Collection incorporating the Brenzett Aeronautical Museum Trust, which as well as exhibiting the remains of various World War II combat aircraft that have been excavated from the surrounding marshland also includes a de Havilland Vampire T.11 and an English Electric Canberra B.2 on display in the museum grounds.

Brenzett was also the site of a Royal Air Force Advanced Landing Ground (ALG) airfield during the Second World War, RAF Brenzett, at one time operating P-51 Mustangs.

Whilst Brenzett is a busy transport hub, it has surrendered its public house (Fleur de Lis), Little Chef restaurant and Post Office, but retains a petrol station and school. The parish church of St Eanswythe is located on the road to Brenzett Green, a remnant of the original A2070 to Hamstreet and Ashford, which was rebuilt entirely in the 1990s. The village’s location as a junction was reflected in prominent signage for Brenzett from Ashford. Many more recent signs show Hastings as the main destination instead.

== In Literature ==
Brenzett was the setting for E. Nesbit's ghost story "Man-size in Marble" from the Grim Tales collection of 1893.

Rudyard Kipling mentions Brenzett in his poem, A three part song.

In the 1981 BBC television comedy drama Private Schulz – which dramatised the genuine but unrealised Second World War plot by the Germans (Operation Bernhard) to print and distribute millions of fake British pound notes – several million pounds' worth of fake pound notes were buried near Brenzett by the character of Private Schulz after he parachuted into Kent, in preparation for their dispersal throughout the British economy.

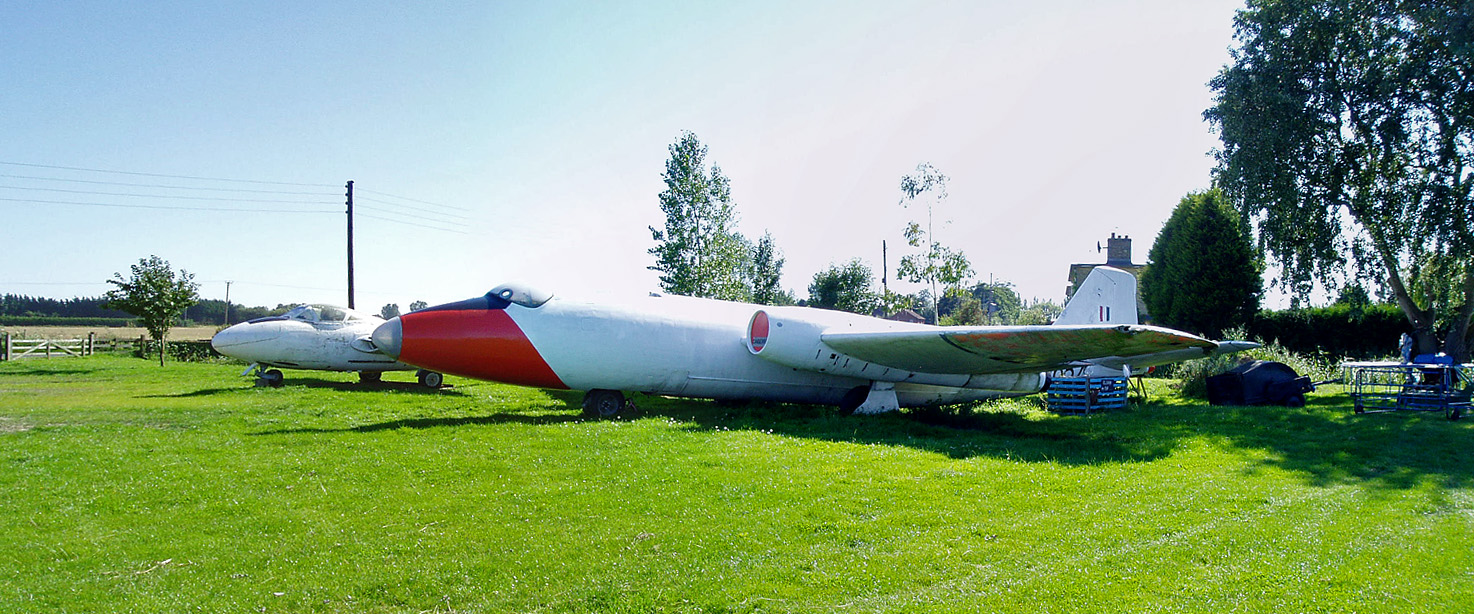
The museum's Vampire & Canberra on display in the museum's grounds
