= Anthony Woods-Scawen =

Royal Air Force officer (1918–1940)

- Born: 18 February 1918; Karachi, British India
- Died: 2 September 1940 (aged 22); Ivychurch, Kent, England
- Relatives: Patrick Woods-Scawen
- Military career
- Allegiance: United Kingdom
- Branch: Royal Air Force
- Service years: 1938–1940
- Rank: Pilot Officer
- Nickname: "Wombat"
- Unit: No. 43 Squadron
- Conflicts: Second World War: Battle of France; Battle of Britain †
- Awards: Distinguished Flying Cross

Charles Anthony Woods-Scawen DFC (18 February 1918 – 2 September 1940) was a British flying ace who served in the Royal Air Force (RAF) during the Second World War. He was credited with having shot down at least seven aircraft.

Born in British India, Woods-Scawen joined the RAF in 1938. After his training was completed, he was posted to No. 43 Squadron. He flew Hawker Hurricane fighters in the Battle of France, providing cover for the evacuation of the British Expeditionary Force from Dunkirk, during which he claimed his first aerial victories. He achieved further success during the Battle of Britain but was killed on 2 September when his parachute failed to open after he bailed out of his aircraft when it was damaged in an engagement with German fighters. His brother Patrick, also a fighter pilot with the RAF, was killed the day before. An award of the Distinguished Flying Cross for Woods-Scawen was announced after his death.

== Early life ==
Charles Anthony Woods-Scawen was born on 18 February 1918 in Karachi, British India, the son of Philip and Kathleen Florence Woods-Scawen. He and his elder brother Patrick returned to the family home in Farnborough, Hampshire in 1924. He was educated at Salesian College, Farnborough. Patrick joined the Royal Air Force (RAF) in 1937, and in March 1938, Anthony followed him into the service on a short service commission. Despite poor eyesight, by memorising the chart used to assess his eyesight he was able to pass his medical tests. Nicknamed 'Wombat', he subsequently had flying googles made with prescription lenses.

Posted to No. 6 Flying Training School at RAF Netheravon two months later as an acting pilot officer, Woods-Scawen completed his flying training in December. He was then posted to No. 43 Squadron. This was based at Tangmere and had just reequipped with the Hawker Hurricane fighter.

== Second World War ==
After the outbreak of the Second World War, No. 43 Squadron moved to Acklington for convoy patrols and then from February 1940, it was based at Wick tasked with protective patrols over shipping moving along the north west coastline. A few months later, it was part of Scapa Flow's aerial defences. In late May, the squadron moved back to Tangmere and it immediately began operating over France, helping cover the evacuation of the British Expeditionary Force from the beaches at Dunkirk.

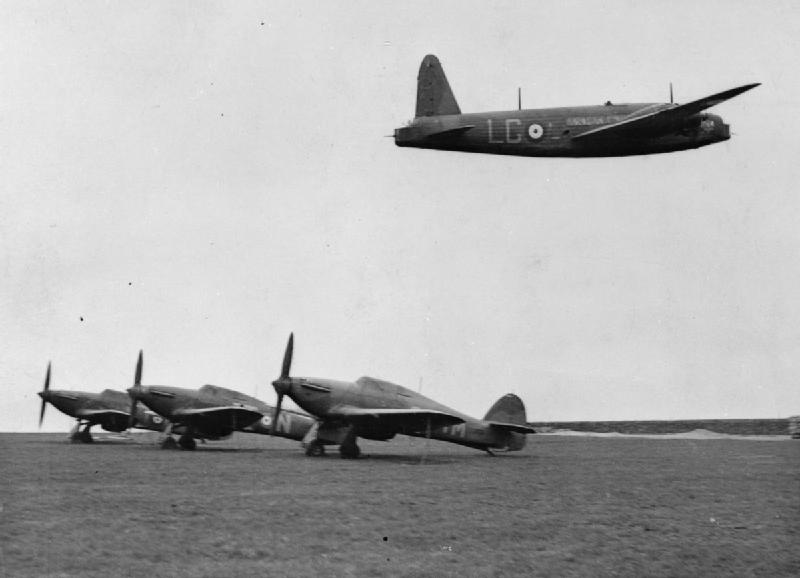
Hawker Hurricane fighters at Wick, April 1940

=== Battle of France ===
Woods-Scawen's Hurricane was damaged with an engagement with Messerschmitt Bf 109 fighters on 31 May and he had to make a crash-landing back at Tangmere. The next day, flying over Dunkirk, he claimed a Bf 109 as shot down although this was unconfirmed. A week later he destroyed another Bf 109 near Dieppe. After this engagement, he had to bale out. He landed behind German lines but was able to walk for several miles before linking up with retreating British troops. Evacuated from Cherbourg Naval Base, Woods-Scawen arrived back at Tangmere on 15 June. Soon afterwards, the squadron's losses saw it briefly being rested for a time.

=== Battle of Britain ===
In July No. 43 Squadron, as well as being called up to intercept Luftwaffe aircraft, was engaged in escort duties, accompanying Bristol Blenheim light bombers to targets in France. Its interception operations increased as the Battle of Britain escalated. On 8 August Woods-Scawen shot down a Messerschmitt Bf 110 heavy fighter off the Isle of Wight, as well as probably destroying three Junkers Ju 87 dive bombers. His own aircraft was damaged and he landed back at Tangmere with minor wounds to his legs as a result of shell splinters. On 12 August he damaged a Heinkel He 111 medium bomber to the south of Selsey Bill and the next day shot down two Junkers Ju 88 over Petworth but was himself shot down. He baled out, unhurt.

Woods-Scawen destroyed another He 111 near Selsey on 15 August and the next day shot down a pair of two Ju 87s to the southeast of Bembridge. He was again shot down, by a Bf 109, off the Sussex coast and baled out with minor injuries. Woods-Scawen claimed a Bf 109 destroyed over Brighton on 30 August. He was shot down in combat over Ivychurch with Bf 109s on 2 September 1940. Although he baled out, he was too low for his parachute to deploy and was killed. His brother Patrick had been reported missing the day before. An award of the Distinguished Flying Cross for Woods-Scawen was gazetted four days after his death. The citation read:

This officer has taken part in all engagements carried out by his squadron since the commencement of hostilities. He has destroyed a total of six enemy aircraft and serviously damaged several others. In June 1940, Pilot Officer Woods-Scawen was shot down, landing some 25 miles within French territory, but succeed in making his way back to his squadron. In spite of the fact this pilot has been shot down six times, he has continued to fight with unabated courage and enthusiasm, and has shown outstanding qualities as a resourceful and determined leader.

— London Gazette, No. 34940, 6 September 1940

Woods-Scawen is credited with the destruction of seven aircraft with an eighth unconfirmed, and one damaged. He is also believed to have probably destroyed four other aircraft. He is buried in Hawkinge Cemetery in Kent. The body of his brother Patrick was found on 6 September in the grounds of The Ivies, Kenley Lane. He had baled out after his aircraft was shot down but his parachute had failed to open.
