= St Matthew's Church, Warehorne =

Anglican parish church in Kent, England

- The church in 2012
- Location: Church Road, Warehorne, Kent
- Country: England
- Denomination: Church of England
- Website: www.achurchnearyou.com/church/12109/

History
- Status: Parish church
- Dedication: St Matthew

Architecture
- Heritage designation: Grade I listed
- Designated: 27 November 1957

Specifications
- Materials: Ragstone, brick

Administration
- Diocese: Canterbury

St Matthew's Church is the Church of England parish church of Warehorne, a village on the edge of Romney Marsh in Kent, England. Built mainly in the 13th and 14th centuries, with a brick west tower of 1777 and a north porch of 1784, it is a Grade I listed building.

== History ==
Warehorne is first recorded in a charter of King Ecgberht of 820, and the Domesday Book records a church there in 1086, but no Saxon or Norman work survives in the present building. The church is built of ragstone and dates mainly from the 13th century, with the aisles and chancel added in the 14th century.

The medieval tower was destroyed by lightning in 1770 and replaced by the present brick tower in 1777. The north porch, of red and blue chequered brick with a shaped gable, has a keystone dated 1784. Writing in 1799, the Kent historian Edward Hasted described St Matthew's as "a large handsome building" and noted that only small remains of painted glass survived in its windows.

Richard Harris Barham, later the author of The Ingoldsby Legends, lived in Warehorne from 1817 while serving as rector of neighbouring Snargate. The church's own records list him as curate of Warehorne from 1817 to 1821.

== Architecture ==
The church has a chancel, a nave with north and south aisles, a west tower and a north porch. The three-bay arcades have round piers of Bethersden Marble, and a carved head survives on the north-west respond. There is no true chancel arch. The nave roof has four crown posts on moulded tie beams, with shorter crown posts in the aisles and three slender ones in the chancel. The aisle windows have 14th-century tracery, the chancel has late 14th-century square-headed windows, and the east window is a four-light Perpendicular design.

== Fittings and monuments ==
Fittings include a 17th-century Bethersden marble font, box pews dated 1738 and 1839, a tower screen with a Royal Arms panel dated 1708, painted boards, and a pulpit of 1905. Fragments of 14th-century figurative and heraldic glass survive, including two facing knights in the east window of the north aisle. Hasted recorded a brass to the rector Thomas Jekin (d. 1438) and a monument to the rector John Coventry (d. 1681); there is also a marble plaque to the Hodges family of Leacon Hall. A medieval mass dial is cut into the wall by the south door.

A silver flagon of 1734, given by an anonymous donor and kept in its original leather case, is held in the treasury of Canterbury Cathedral.

== Organ ==
The church has a small chamber organ by Theodore Bates of London, dating from the early 1840s, which was brought to Warehorne in the 1980s. When it was restored in 2026, fragments of an 1842 London theatre poster were found inside two of its pipes, helping to date the instrument.

== Bells ==
The tower holds a ring of six bells. Three, including the tenor, were cast by John Waylett in 1721; two were recast by Alfred Bowell of Ipswich in 1913, and Bowell added a new treble in 1936. Hasted recorded five bells in 1799.

== Present day ==
St Matthew's is an active parish church in the Diocese of Canterbury.

== See also ==
- Grade I listed buildings in Ashford (borough)
