= Listed buildings in Ruckinge =

Civil Parish in Kent, England

Ruckinge is a village and civil parish in the Borough of Ashford of Kent, England. It contains one grade I and twelve grade II listed buildings that are recorded in the National Heritage List for England.

This list is based on the information retrieved online from Historic England.

== Key ==
Grade	Criteria
I	Buildings that are of exceptional interest
II*	Particularly important buildings of more than special interest
II	Buildings that are of special interest

== Listing ==
Name	Grade	Location	Type	Completed (Note: The date given is the date used by Historic England as significant for the initial building or that of an important part in the structure's description.)	Date designated	Grid ref. (Note: The grid reference is based on the British national grid reference system, sometimes known as OSGB36, used by the Ordnance Survey.) Geo-coordinates	Notes	Entry number (Note: The "List Entry Number" is a unique number assigned to each listed building and scheduled monument by Historic England.)	Image	Wikidata
Harrison House	II	Ash Hill			10 August 1988	TR0218433843; 51°04′06″N 0°53′04″E		1185036	Upload Photo	Q26480345
Horton Green	II	Ash Hill			10 August 1988	TR0178534661; 51°04′33″N 0°52′45″E		1071202	Upload Photo	Q26326200
Brisley Cottage	II	Brisleywood Lane			10 August 1988	TR0161236820; 51°05′43″N 0°52′40″E		1362771	Upload Photo	Q26644640
Danlee Farmhouse	II	Bromley Green			10 August 1988	TQ9947636736; 51°05′43″N 0°50′51″E		1185041	Upload Photo	Q26480351
Chestnuts	II	Capel Road			10 August 1988	TR0099635829; 51°05′12″N 0°52′07″E		1185047	Upload Photo	Q26480358
Gorse Green Farmhouse	II	Capel Road			10 August 1988	TR0103735967; 51°05′16″N 0°52′09″E		1071203	Upload Photo	Q26326202
Black Beams	II	Marsh Road			10 August 1988	TR0260833627; 51°03′58″N 0°53′25″E		1071205	Upload Photo	Q26326207
Hollybush Farmhouse	II	Poundhurst Road			27 November 1957	TR0116635010; 51°04′45″N 0°52′14″E		1185112	Upload Photo	Q26480423
Church of St Mary Magdalene	I	The Corner			27 November 1957	TR0247433535; 51°03′56″N 0°53′18″E		1185079	Church of St Mary Magdalene More images	Q17529339
Court Lodge	II	The Corner			10 August 1988	TR0239233497; 51°03′54″N 0°53′14″E		1362772	Upload Photo	Q26644641
Monument to Ransley Family, About 10 Metres South East of Church of St Mary Magdalene	II	About 10 Metres South East Of Church Of St Mary Magdalene, The Corner			10 August 1988	TR0249333524; 51°03′55″N 0°53′19″E		1071204	Upload Photo	Q26326204
Ransley Cottage	II	The Corner			10 August 1988	TR0258233635; 51°03′59″N 0°53′24″E		1185104	Upload Photo	Q26480412
Wey Street Farmhouse	II	Wey Street			10 August 1988	TR0284131701; 51°02′56″N 0°53′33″E		1071206	Upload Photo	Q26326208

== See also ==
- Grade I listed buildings in Kent
- Grade II* listed buildings in Kent

== Sources ==
- Newman, John (2012) [1969], Kent: West and the Weald, The Buildings of England, New Haven and London: Yale University Press, ISBN 978-0-300-18509-6
