= Church of St Rumwold, Bonnington =

Church in Kent, England

Church of St Rumwold
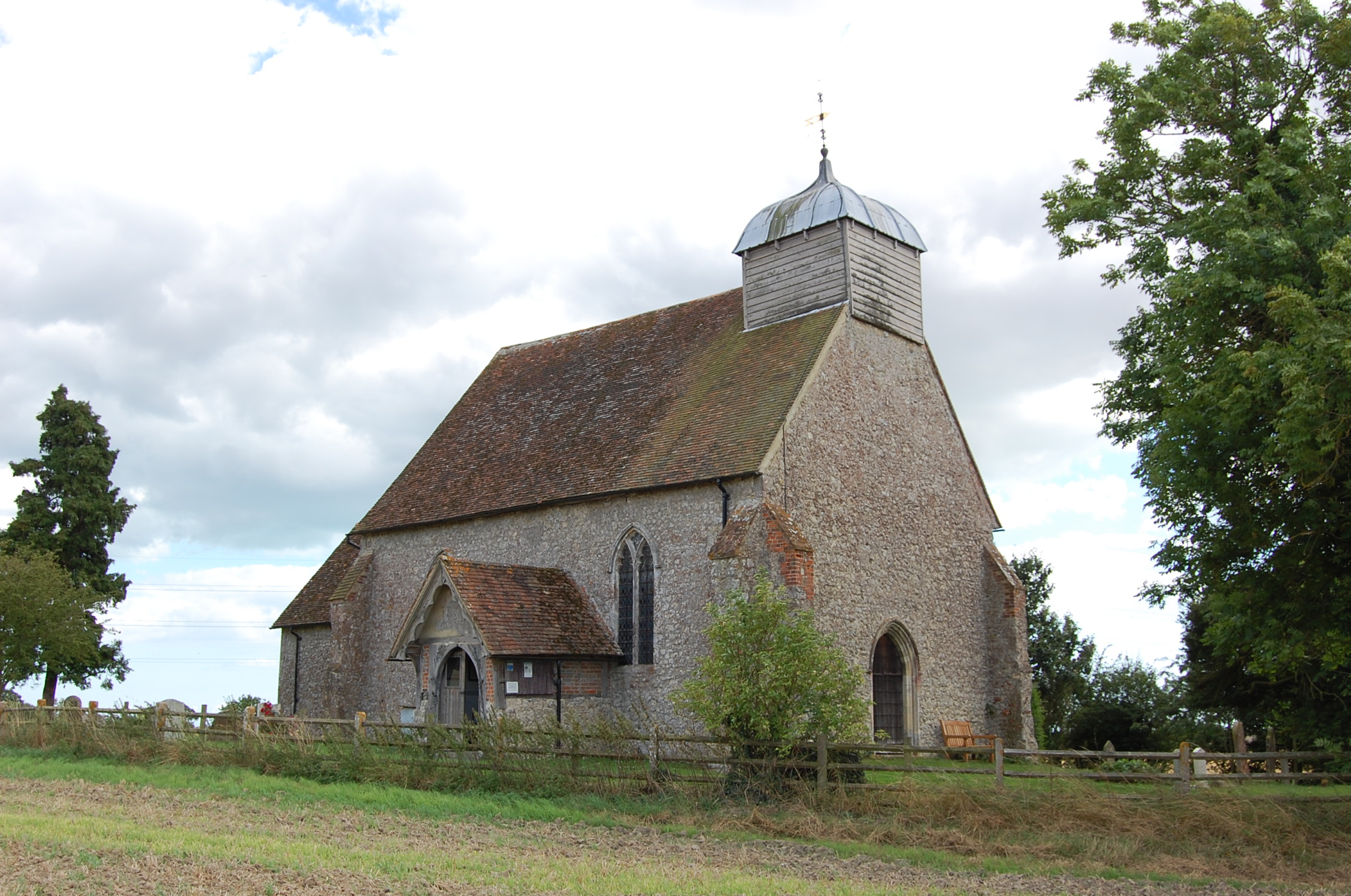

- Location in Kent
- 51°04′20″N 0°56′06″E
- Denomination: Church of England

History
- Dedication: St Rumwold

Architecture
- Functional status: Church of England parish church
- Heritage designation: Grade I
- Designated: 27 November 1957

Administration
- Province: Canterbury
- Diocese: Canterbury
- Archdeaconry: Ashford
- Deanery: Romney and Tenterden
- Parish: Bonnington

Clergy
- Vicar: Revd Geoff Abasolo-Munnery

St Rumwold's Church is an active parish church in the parish of Bonnington, Kent, England. It is a Grade I listed building.

== History ==
Bonnington is a small, scattered parish adjacent to Romney Marsh. In the Middle Ages the manor was owned by the Order of Knights of the Hospital of Saint John of Jerusalem. The church is dedicated to St Rumwold, an infant saint reputed to have lived for only three days. (Note: Dedications to St Rumwold (Rumbold) are rare, there being eight in England.) Historic England gives a foundation date for the present church as the 12th century. It stands near to the Royal Military Canal which was built as a defensive line during the Napoleonic Wars.

St Rumwold's remains an active parish church and regular services are held. In April 2023, the funeral of Paul O'Grady was held at the church.

== Architecture ==
The church dates from the 12th century and comprises a nave, chancel and a small turret. Built of Kentish ragstone, it is a Grade I listed building.

== Gallery ==
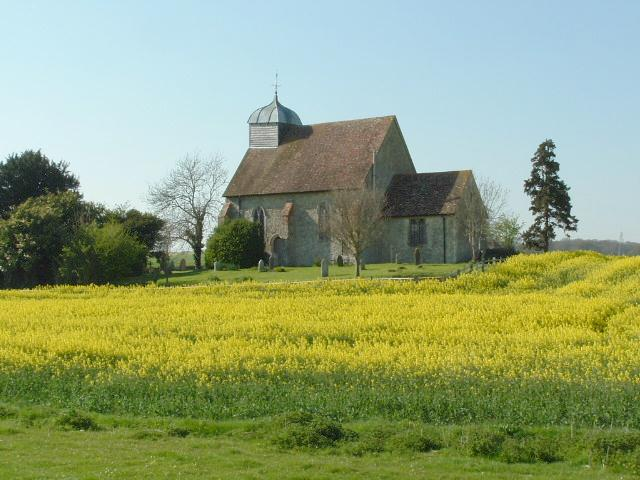
St Rumwold's in fields

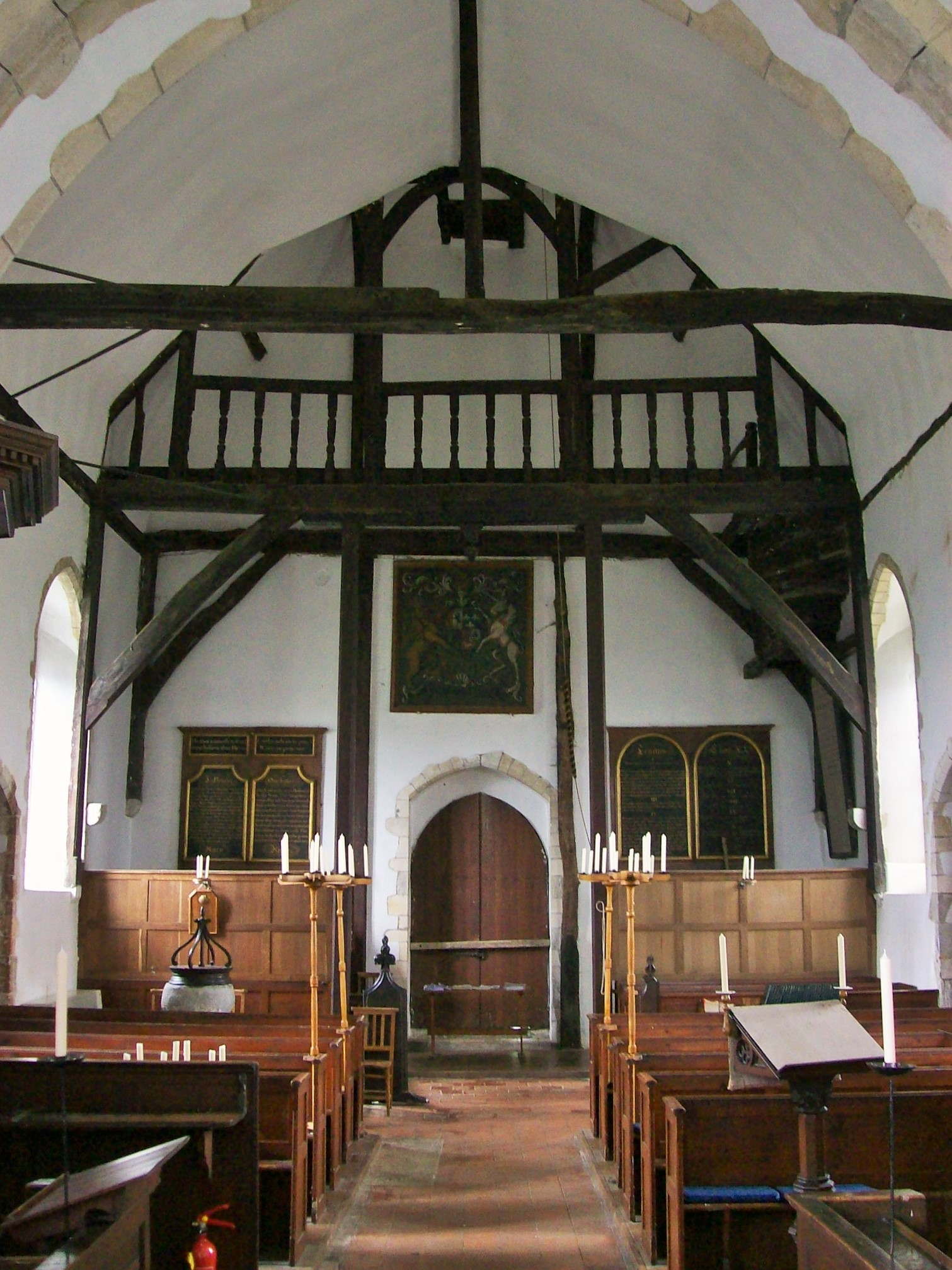
The interior

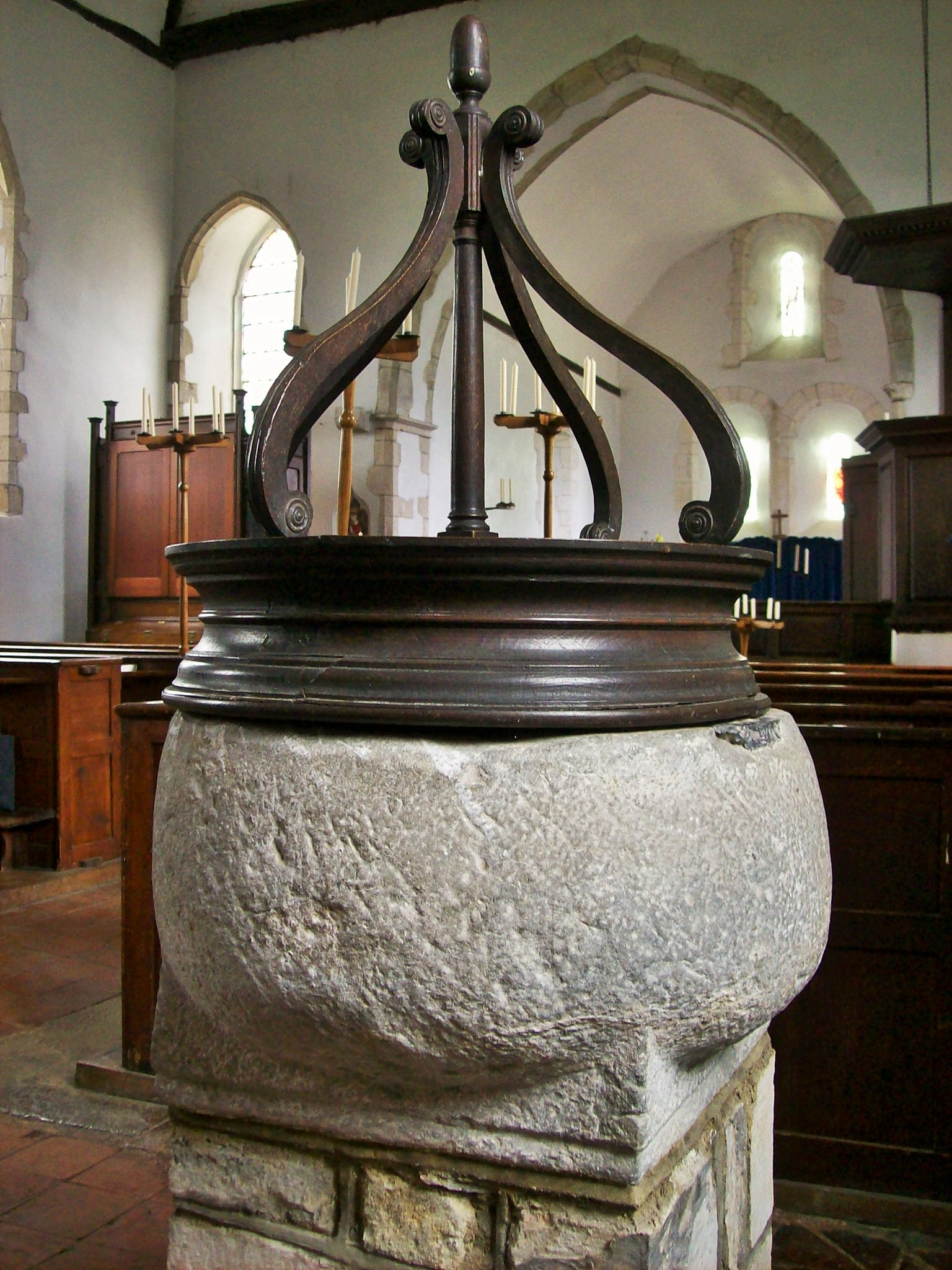
The font

== See also ==
- Media related to St Rumwold's Church, Bonnington at Wikimedia Commons

== Sources ==
- Hasted, Edward (1799). "Bonnington". The History and Topographical Survey of the County of Kent. Vol. 8. Canterbury: W. Bristow. OCLC 367530442.
