= No. 129 Squadron RAF =

Defunct flying squadron of the Royal Air Force

No. 129 (Mysore) Squadron RAF
- Country: United Kingdom
- Branch: Royal Air Force
- Role: Fighter Command.
- Nickname(s): Mysore
- Motto(s): I will defend the right.
- Aircraft: Supermarine Spitfire; North American Mustang
- Engagements: World War II • Home Defence • Operation Overlord

Insignia
- Squadron Badge heraldry: The Gunda Bherunda of MysoreThe badge associates the sqn with the Indian Province of Mysore.

No. 129 (Mysore) Squadron was a Royal Air Force squadron active in World War II.

== World War I ==
Like a number of others, No. 129 was first created in the latter months of the First World War as a day bomber unit based at RAF Duxford. It never became operational due to the Armistice.

== World War II ==
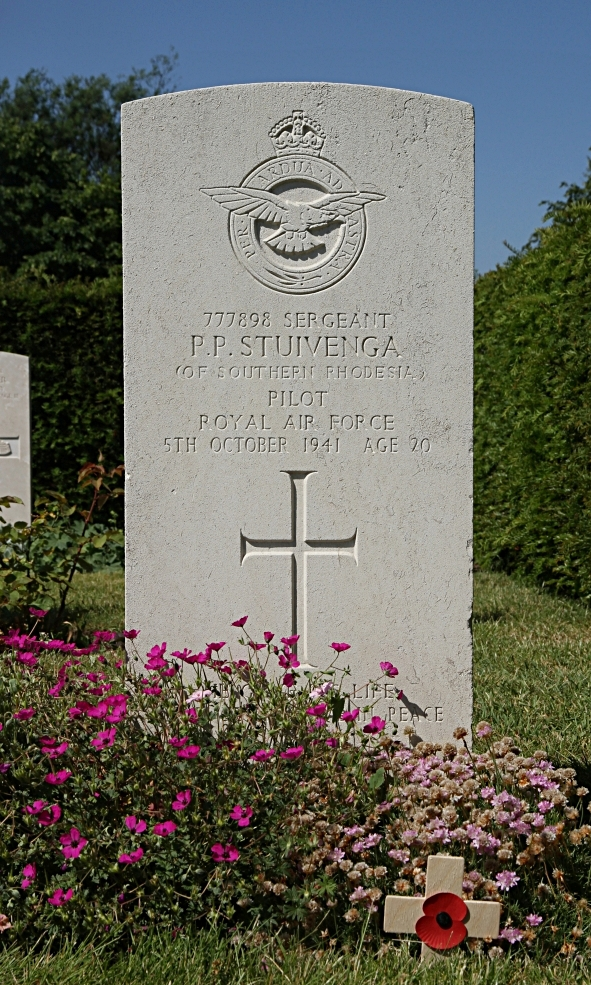
Grave in Chichester, England, of Sgt Patrick Stuivenga, from Southern Rhodesia, who was a pilot in 129 Squadron, and died in 1941

No. 129 Squadron was reformed on 16 June 1941 at RAF Leconfield equipped with Spitfires.

As a result of the Indian government raising large sums of money through its sale of War Bonds a number of squadrons within the RAF were given names of Indian cities and provinces in recognition of this. No. 129 became No. 129 (Mysore) Squadron being named after Mysore province in southwest India. The squadron's badge, the Ghunda Berunda of Mysore, also reflects this association.

After spending August 1942 providing bomber escort and undertaking offensive sweeps over France the squadron moved to Orkney in Northern Scotland to provide local air defence.

The squadron returned south in February 1943 undertaking anti-shipping and escort missions. 129 Squadron became part of the 2nd Tactical Air Force in June 1943 converting to the P-51 Mustang in April 1944 in time for Operation Overlord. After forming part of the 133 (Polish) Wing for D-Day the squadron returned to RAF Brenzett where it undertook anti V-1 activities.

With a move to East Anglia in late 1944 the squadron provided long range fighter cover for RAF Bomber Commands daylight raids.

The squadron spent from June to December 1945 in Norway converting back to Spitfires.

At RAF Church Fenton on 1 September 1946 the squadron was renumbered to No. 257 Squadron.

After the war, it was turned into 129 Tunbridge Wells squadron air cadets
