= Ruckinge =

Village in Kent, England

Coordinates: 51.0656°N 0.8626°E

- Location within Kent
- Area: 13.91 km^{2} (5.37 sq mi)
- Population: 767 (Civil Parish 2021)
  - Density: 55/km^{2} (140/sq mi)
- OS grid reference: TR025335
- Civil parish: Ruckinge
- District: Ashford
- Shire county: Kent
- Region: South East
- Country: England
- Sovereign state: United Kingdom
- Post town: Ashford
- Postcode district: TN26
- Dialling code: 01233
- Police: Kent
- Fire: Kent
- Ambulance: South East Coast
- UK Parliament: Weald of Kent

Ruckinge /rʌkɪndʒ/ is a village and civil parish in south Kent centred 5.5 miles (8.9 km) south of Ashford on the B2067 Hamstreet to Hythe road, with two settled neighbourhoods. It is, broadly defined, a narrow, fairly large rural parish of land which is about one quarter woodland.

== Geography ==
Almost three miles long, this is a mostly rural area in south to south-east Kent centred 6 miles (9.7 km) south-by-southeast of Ashford on the B2067 Hamstreet to Hythe road, with two settled neighbourhoods.Ruckinge's main neighbourhood is a linear settlement with a few cul de sacs.

It is in the mid-south of a civil parish which also includes the scattered community of Bromley Green which has about half of the area's woodland. The two halves (Upper and Lower or North and South) are split by a belt of woodland but a road links them, with the other roads being two east–west and two to the north-east and north-west. A source of the fast-flowing, steep headwaters of the East Stour rises a mile west of the northern half of the parish in an area of Sandstone hills. In terms of vegetation patchy remains are preserved here of The Weald, the forest between the Greensand Ridge and the South Downs, and to the south of the Royal Military Canal the area has long been grassed, being just above marsh level since the Roman Britain period.

== Amenities and voluntary organisations ==
The village no longer has a pub, The Blue Anchor is now an office building. There is a Methodist chapel. The Royal Military Canal runs to the immediate south of the neighbourhood of Ruckinge in the parish.

The nearest shops and railway station are in nearby Hamstreet (in Orlestone).

Ruckinge has the HQs and groups of Scout and Guide associations for the neighbouring parishes.

== St Mary Magdalene church ==
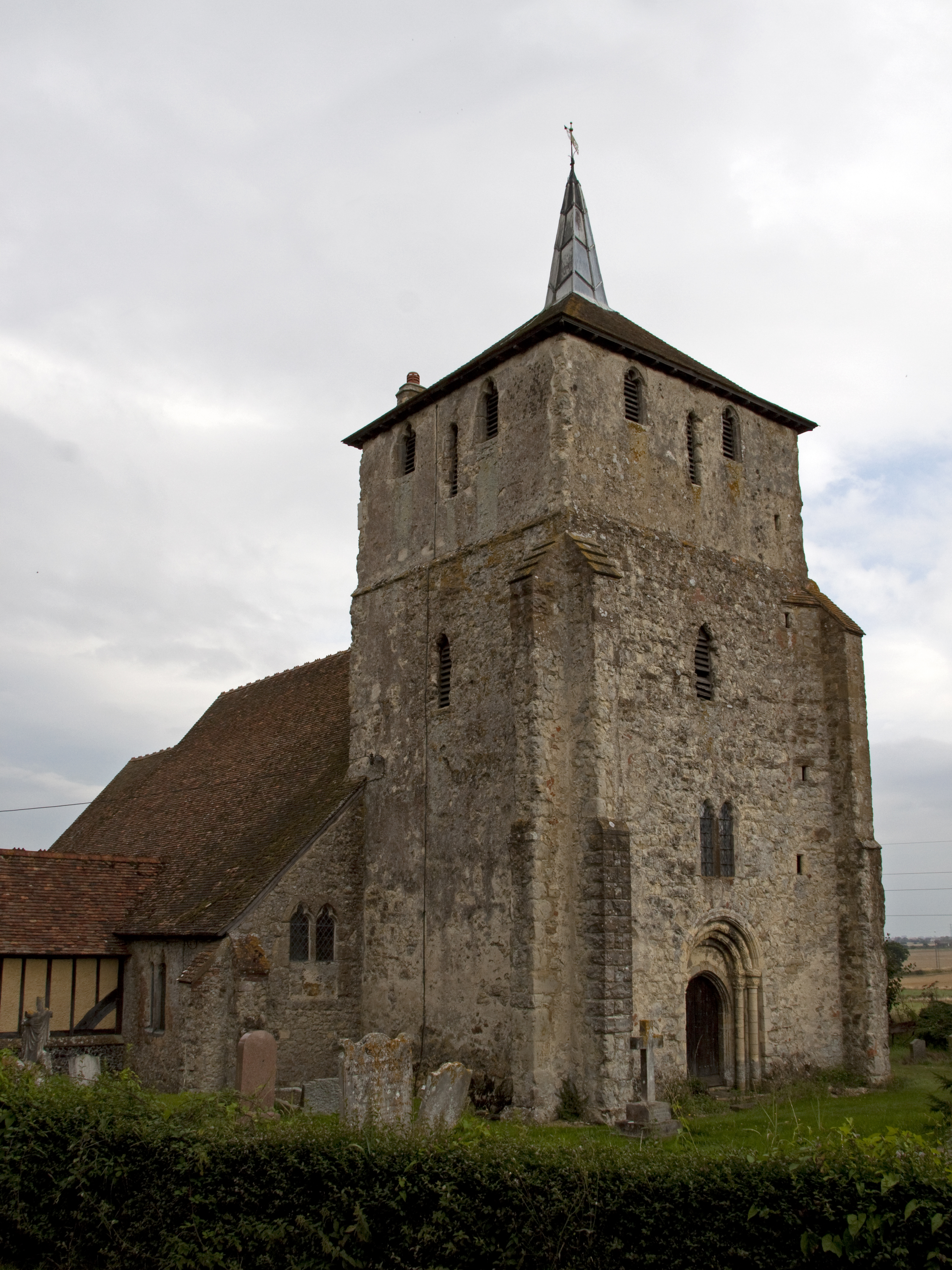
St Mary Magdalene's Church

The Anglican parish church of St Mary Magdalene is a grade I listed building. A church was mentioned in the Domesday Book of 1086, but the present building dates from the 12th century. (Note: Immediately before the main entry for Ruckinge is that for Orlestone. Domesday says that there are 2 churches, where the second one was is unclear. Hussey suggests that this might be Ruckinge.) It is thought probable that the church was built on top of an earlier Saxon building. The main building is 12th century with the upper part of the tower being rebuilt in the 13th century. The church has 14th- and 15th-century alterations. The south doorway and the western door are in Norman style dating from the original 12th-century build. The north porch sheltered a reputed 14th-century door (described as "fine" by English Heritage). The southern choir stalls are medieval with poppy-head bench ends.

The tower houses a ring of 5 bells (tenor 11 long cwt 1 qr 4 lb (1,264 lb or 573 kg) in A). The earliest mention of the bells was in 1521 when Roger Hawkyns left 2/- (two shillings or 10p in decimal currency) in his will to repair them. Thirty years later there were three bells and in 1721 at least four bells were there. In 1740 the tenor was either supplied or recast giving the five bells which exist today.

== History ==
The village of Ruckinge is mentioned in the Domesday Book of 1086, where it appears as Rochinges. The name is first attested in an Anglo-Saxon charter of 786, where it appears as Hroching. This is the Old English hrocing meaning 'rook wood'.

According to the Domesday Book, Hugh de Montfort held a lot of land in the area, including in Ham Hundred both Orlestone and Ruckinge. "Hugh fitzRichard holds of Hugh half a sulung (Note: usually taken as about 2 hides of around 120 acres (49 hectares) each.) in Ruckinge which Leofraed held of King Edward. (Note: Edward the Confessor) It is assessed at half a sulung. There is land for 2 ploughs. There 12 villans now have 1 1/2 ploughs. For the woodland 1 pig. TRE (Note: "Tempore Regis Edwardi" ie "in the time of King Edward [the Confessor]".) it was worth 50s: (Note: shillings, 1/20 of a pound) and afterwards 30s: now 50s."

In 1629, Henry Cuffin, a curate at Ruckinge, was prosecuted by an Archdeacon's Court for playing cricket on Sunday evening after prayers. He claimed that several of his fellow players were "persons of repute and fashion".

Ruckinge was an important sighting-point for the Anglo-French Survey (1784–1790), which calculated the precise distance between the Royal Greenwich Observatory and the Paris Observatory, using trigonometry. The main cross-channel sightings were between Dover Castle and Fairlight, East Sussex in England, and Cap Blanc Nez, Calais and Dunkirk in France. A grid of triangles was measured to link these viewpoints, which included two base-lines on Hounslow Heath and Romney Marsh. Ruckinge was the north-western point of the Romney Marsh base-line; the south-eastern end was at High Nook near Dymchurch.

For a few centuries smuggling was rife on Romney Marsh, and it is rumoured that the notorious Ransley brothers were buried in Ruckinge churchyard after being hanged at Penenden Heath, Maidstone.

Until the early 1990s Ruckinge had a village shop/post office.

== Transport ==
The area is quickly connected to Ashford: the relatively large A2070 road cuts over/under minor roads and passes through the north of this area.

== See also ==
- Listed buildings in Ruckinge

== Bibliography ==
- Birley, Derek (1999). A Social History of English Cricket. Aurum. ISBN 1-85410-710-0.
- Bowen, Rowland (1970). Cricket: A History of its Growth and Development. Eyre & Spottiswoode.
- "St Mary Magdalene, Ruckinge". The Church of England. 2017.
- Historic England, "Church of St Mary Magdalene (1185079)", National Heritage List for England
- Hussey, Arthur (1852). "Notes on the Churches O-R" . Notes on the churches in the counties of Kent, Sussex, and Surrey. John Russell Smith – via Wikisource.
- Love, Dickon. "Ruckinge, S Mary Magd". Love's Guide to the Church Bells of Kent.
- Williams, Dr Ann; Martin, Professor G H, eds. (1992) [original Latin version compiled 1086]. Domesday Book. Penguin Classics. ISBN 0-141-43994-7.
