= St Mary Magdalene Church, Ruckinge =

Church in Ruckinge, Kent

St Mary Magdalene Church
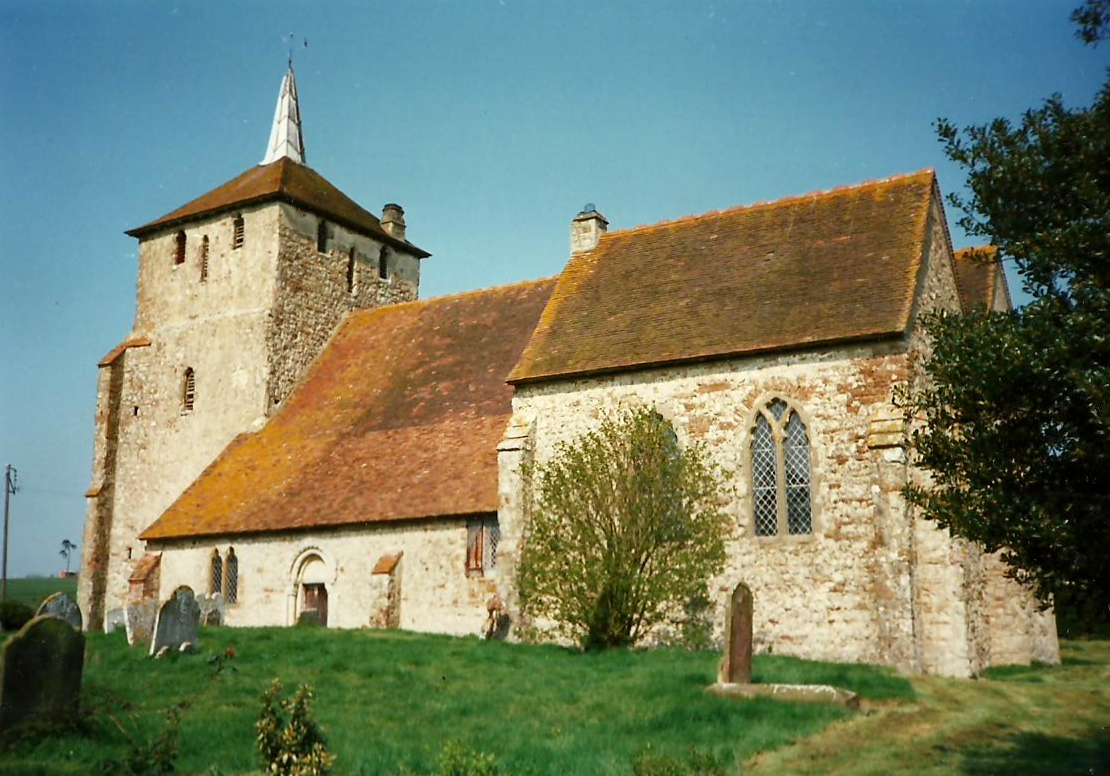
- St Mary Magdalene Church, Ruckinge
- St Mary Magdalene Church
- 51.06562°N 0.88842°E
- OS grid reference: TR 02474 33535
- Location: Ruckinge, Kent
- Country: England
- Denomination: Anglican

Architecture
- Heritage designation: Grade I

Administration
- Diocese: Canterbury

St Mary Magdalene Church, Ruckinge is a parish church located in Ruckinge, Kent, England. The church was built in the 12th century, probably on the site of an earlier church. In the 13th century the tower was rebuilt. Among the few surviving Norman features are the south doorway and the western door. The entire building was remodeled in the 14th and 15th centuries. It is a Grade I listed building.

== Description ==
St Mary Magdalene Church is located in the village of Ruckinge, south of Ashford in Kent. The church was built in the 12th century with Kentish ragstone. The building's layout consists of a wide nave with 14th-century aisles, chancel, north and south chapel, two-stage western tower with lead spire and a wooden north porch. The south aisle contains a Norman doorway with two scratch dials carved into the stone fabric. There are 14th-century glass fragments in the east window of the north aisle featuring St George and the Dragon. The 14th-century chancel has medieval choir stalls with poppyhead bench ends. The south chapel projects outward with offset corner buttresses and contains a blocked 18th-century brick doorway. On the south wall of the tower is a reredos painted to look like marble.

Furnishings include an ogee-headed piscina in the east wall of the chancel, a 17th-century altar table, a mid-18th-century altar rail, a piscina in the south chapel, a plain octagonal font with base, and a 19th-century Gothic style pulpit. The upper stage of the tower dates to the 13th century. The tower has offset corner buttresses and a spiral staircase which is located at the south-west corner. In the tower's western side is a 15th-century decorated doorway set into a larger outer Norman doorway.

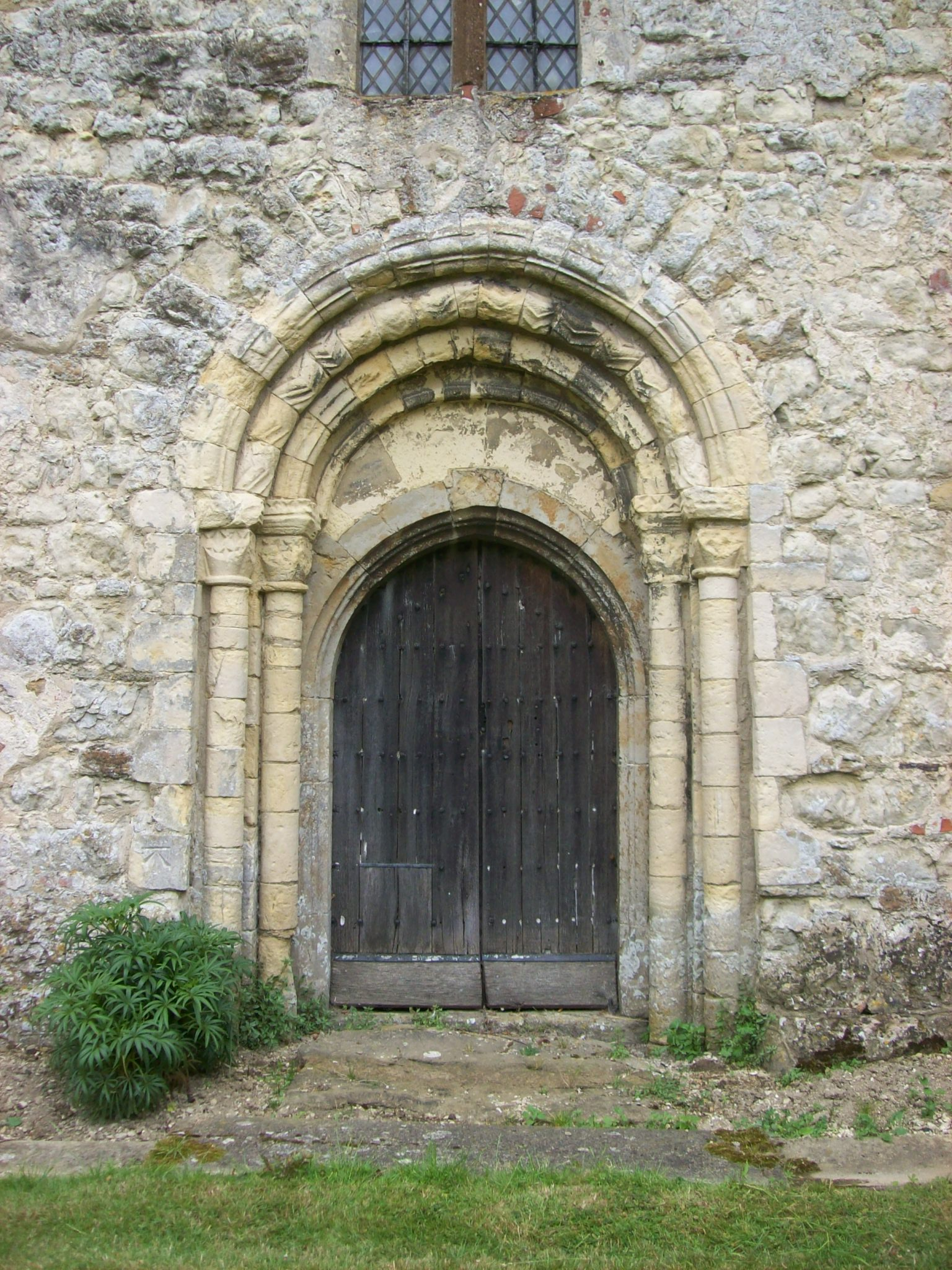
West door, St Mary Magdalene

== History ==
St Mary Magdalene dates to the 12th century and was most likely built on the site of an older Anglo-Saxon church. It is recorded in the Domesday book in 1086. The western tower was rebuilt in the 13th century. The building was remodeled in the 14th and 15th centuries.

A major storm in 1987 caused severe damage to the church, which has since been fully repaired. The interior plasterwork was restored in 2011.

The St Mary Magdalene Church was designated a Grade I listed building in 1957.

== See also ==
- Grade I listed buildings in Ashford (borough)
