= Listed buildings in Warehorne =

Civil Parish in Kent, England

Warehorne is a village and civil parish in the Borough of Ashford of Kent, England. It contains one grade I, one grade II* and 33 grade II listed buildings that are recorded in the National Heritage List for England.

This list is based on the information retrieved online from Historic England.

== Key ==
Grade	Criteria
I	Buildings that are of exceptional interest
II*	Particularly important buildings of more than special interest
II	Buildings that are of special interest

== Listing ==
Name	Grade	Location	Type	Completed (Note: The date given is the date used by Historic England as significant for the initial building or that of an important part in the structure's description.)	Date designated	Grid ref. (Note: The grid reference is based on the British national grid reference system, sometimes known as OSGB36, used by the Ordnance Survey.) Geo-coordinates	Notes	Entry number (Note: The "List Entry Number" is a unique number assigned to each listed building and scheduled monument by Historic England.)	Image	Wikidata
Hatch Farmhouse	II				10 August 1988	TQ9672934449; 51°04′32″N 0°48′25″E		1362799	Upload Photo	Q26644665
Parsonage Farmhouse	II				13 October 1952	TQ9733234662; 51°04′38″N 0°48′56″E		1185403	Upload Photo	Q26480718
Spot House Farmhouse	II				27 November 1957	TQ9729635121; 51°04′53″N 0°48′55″E		1071181	Upload Photo	Q26326163
Tucker's Farmhouse	II				10 August 1988	TQ9709834479; 51°04′33″N 0°48′44″E		1071182	Upload Photo	Q26326164
Chest Tomb About 50 Metres South West of Church of St Matthew	II	Church Road			10 August 1988	TQ9893432476; 51°03′26″N 0°50′14″E		1185542	Upload Photo	Q26480860
Chest Tomb and Headstone 1 to 3 Metres South of Church of St Matthew	II	Church Road			10 August 1988	TQ9898232501; 51°03′27″N 0°50′17″E		1185513	Upload Photo	Q26480829
Chest Tomb and Headstone About 15 Metres South West of Church of St Matthew	II	Church Road			10 August 1988	TQ9897032492; 51°03′26″N 0°50′16″E		1185535	Upload Photo	Q26480853
Chest Tomb to Hodges Family, About 15 Metres South of Church of St Matthew	II	About 15 Metres South Of Church Of St Matthew, Church Road			10 August 1988	TQ9898632495; 51°03′26″N 0°50′17″E		1071184	Upload Photo	Q26326167
Chest Tomb to Hodges Family, About 2 Metres South of Church of St Matthew	II	About 2 Metres South Of Church Of St Matthew, Church Road			10 August 1988	TQ9898732502; 51°03′27″N 0°50′17″E		1362801	Upload Photo	Q26644667
Church Farmhouse	II	Church Road			27 November 1987	TQ9903032532; 51°03′27″N 0°50′19″E		1185445	Upload Photo	Q26480761
Church of St Matthew	I	Church Road			27 November 1957	TQ9898832512; 51°03′27″N 0°50′17″E		1071183	Church of St Matthew More images	Q17529269
Headstone to Margaret Burges, About 4 Metres South of Church of St Matthew	II	About 4 Metres South Of Church Of St Matthew, Church Road			10 August 1988	TQ9899132500; 51°03′26″N 0°50′17″E		1185520	Upload Photo	Q26480838
Headstone to Richard Jervis, About 10 Metres South West of Church of St Matthew	II	About 10 Metres South West Of Church Of St Matthew, Church Road			10 August 1988	TQ9897432498; 51°03′26″N 0°50′16″E		1071185	Upload Photo	Q26326169
Mountfield	II	Church Road			1 July 1987	TQ9900432702; 51°03′33″N 0°50′18″E		1362800	Upload Photo	Q26644666
The Woolpack Inn	II	Church Road			10 August 1988	TQ9894032561; 51°03′29″N 0°50′15″E		1185431	The Woolpack Inn More images	Q26480745
Tinton	II	Church Road			10 August 1988	TQ9871832459; 51°03′25″N 0°50′03″E		1071931	Upload Photo	Q26327298
Two Headstones to Down Family About 20 Metres South West of Church of St Matthew	II	Church Road			10 August 1988	TQ9896732489; 51°03′26″N 0°50′16″E		1362802	Upload Photo	Q26644668
Ham Mill Green	II	Ham Mill Lane			10 August 1988	TR0018231568; 51°02′55″N 0°51′17″E		1362432	Upload Photo	Q26644321
Burr Farmhouse	II	Ham Street Road			27 November 1957	TQ9937433256; 51°03′50″N 0°50′38″E		1071934	Upload Photo	Q26327302
Gold House	II	Ham Street Road			10 August 1988	TQ9865932969; 51°03′42″N 0°50′01″E		1362433	Upload Photo	Q26644322
Keepers Cottage Middle Platt	II	Ham Street Road, Hamstreet			10 August 1988	TR0004833402; 51°03′54″N 0°51′13″E		1299614	Upload Photo	Q26586996
Leacon Hall	II*	Ham Street Road			10 August 1988	TQ9866333087; 51°03′46″N 0°50′02″E		1185579	Leacon Hall More images	Q17556389
Lordens	II	Ham Street Road			10 August 1988	TR0005433398; 51°03′54″N 0°51′14″E		1071936	Upload Photo	Q26327305
Oasthouse About 25 Metres North West of Burr Farmhouse	II	Ham Street Road			10 August 1988	TQ9934933299; 51°03′52″N 0°50′37″E		1185582	Upload Photo	Q26480899
Spring Cottages	II	1-4, Ham Street Road, Hamstreet			10 August 1988	TQ9993233390; 51°03′54″N 0°51′07″E		1071935	Upload Photo	Q26327304
The Leacon	II	Ham Street Road			10 August 1988	TQ9864332966; 51°03′42″N 0°50′00″E		1185587	Upload Photo	Q26480904
Bluebell Cottage	II	Kenardington Road			10 August 1988	TQ9828032945; 51°03′42″N 0°49′42″E		1185557	Upload Photo	Q26480875
House 30 Metres West of Stone Farmhouse	II	Kenardington Road			10 August 1988	TQ9802032893; 51°03′40″N 0°49′28″E		1185560	Upload Photo	Q26480879
Stone Farmhouse	II	Kenardington Road			10 August 1988	TQ9806232862; 51°03′39″N 0°49′30″E		1362431	Upload Photo	Q26644320
Leacon Farmhouse	II	School Hill			10 August 1988	TQ9847433374; 51°03′55″N 0°49′53″E		1185595	Upload Photo	Q26480911
Lilyfields	II	School Hill			10 August 1988	TQ9845333200; 51°03′50″N 0°49′51″E		1362394	Upload Photo	Q26644287
Mill House	II	School Hill			10 August 1988	TQ9853633040; 51°03′44″N 0°49′55″E		1071937	Upload Photo	Q26327307
1-4, the Green	II	1-4, The Green			10 August 1988	TQ9897832620; 51°03′30″N 0°50′17″E		1071932	Upload Photo	Q26327299
Churchfield Terrace	II	The Green			10 August 1988	TQ9894832622; 51°03′30″N 0°50′15″E		1185575	Upload Photo	Q26480894
Pilgrims Cottages	II	The Green			10 August 1988	TQ9895632583; 51°03′29″N 0°50′16″E		1071933	Upload Photo	Q26327301

== See also ==
- Grade I listed buildings in Kent
- Grade II* listed buildings in Kent

== Sources ==
- Newman, John (2012) [1969], Kent: West and the Weald, The Buildings of England, New Haven and London: Yale University Press, ISBN 978-0-300-18509-6
