= Listed buildings in Orlestone =

Historic structures in Kent, England

Orlestone is a village and civil parish in the Borough of Ashford of Kent, England. It contains two grade II* and ten grade II listed buildings that are recorded in the National Heritage List for England.

This list is based on the information retrieved online from Historic England.

== Key ==
Grade	Criteria
I	Buildings that are of exceptional interest
II*	Particularly important buildings of more than special interest
II	Buildings that are of special interest

== Listing ==
Name	Grade	Location	Type	Completed (Note: The date given is the date used by Historic England as significant for the initial building or that of an important part in the structure's description.)	Date designated	Grid ref. (Note: The grid reference is based on the British national grid reference system, sometimes known as OSGB36, used by the Ordnance Survey.) Geo-coordinates	Notes	Entry number (Note: The "List Entry Number" is a unique number assigned to each listed building and scheduled monument by Historic England.)	Image	Wikidata
Old Eastside	II	Ashford Road, Hamstreet			10 August 1988	TR0011933436; 51°03′55″N 0°51′17″E		1184950	Old Eastside More images	Q26480260
The Old Bakery	II	Ashford Road, Hamstreet			27 November 1957	TR0008733423; 51°03′55″N 0°51′15″E		1071197	Upload Photo	Q26326190
Barn About 50 Metres South East of Capel House	II	Capel Road			15 February 1988	TQ9985635501; 51°05′02″N 0°51′08″E		1071198	Upload Photo	Q26326192
Capel House	II	Capel Road			15 February 1988	TQ9980635545; 51°05′04″N 0°51′05″E		1184965	Upload Photo	Q26480276
Sugarloaf	II	Capel Road			10 August 1988	TQ9936935284; 51°04′56″N 0°50′42″E		1071199	Upload Photo	Q26326194
Church of St Mary the Virgin	II*	Church Lane			27 November 1957	TR0001034696; 51°04′36″N 0°51′14″E		1184978	Church of St Mary the Virgin More images	Q17556366
Court Lodge	II*	Church Lane			13 October 1952	TQ9998434641; 51°04′34″N 0°51′13″E		1184992	Upload Photo	Q17556372
Headstone About 10 Metres South of Chancel Church of St Mary	II	Church Lane			10 August 1988	TR0001734689; 51°04′36″N 0°51′14″E		1071200	Upload Photo	Q26326196
Bromley Green Farmhouse	II	Hamstreet Road			27 November 1957	TQ9894536507; 51°05′36″N 0°50′23″E		1362770	Upload Photo	Q26644638
Hamstreet and Orlestone Railway Station	II	St Marys Close, Hamstreet			9 May 2005	TR0009033762; 51°04′06″N 0°51′16″E		1391381	Upload Photo	Q26670746
Fairlawn	II	The Street, Hamstreet			10 August 1988	TR0012333318; 51°03′52″N 0°51′17″E		1071201	Upload Photo	Q26326198
Stores House Street House the Timbers Woodville	II	The Street, Hamstreet			10 August 1988	TR0009833407; 51°03′54″N 0°51′16″E		1299876	Upload Photo	Q26587232

== See also ==
- Grade I listed buildings in Kent
- Grade II* listed buildings in Kent

== Sources ==
- Newman, John (2012) [1969], Kent: West and the Weald, The Buildings of England, New Haven and London: Yale University Press, ISBN 978-0-300-18509-6
