= Listed buildings in Bonnington =

Civil Parish in Kent, England

Bonnington is a village and civil parish in the Borough of Ashford of Kent, England. It contains one grade I and five grade II listed buildings that are recorded in the National Heritage List for England.

This list is based on the information retrieved online from Historic England.

== Key ==
Grade	Criteria
I	Buildings that are of exceptional interest
II*	Particularly important buildings of more than special interest
II	Buildings that are of special interest

== Listing ==
Name	Grade	Location	Type	Completed (Note: The date given is the date used by Historic England as significant for the initial building or that of an important part in the structure's description.)	Date designated	Grid ref. (Note: The grid reference is based on the British national grid reference system, sometimes known as OSGB36, used by the Ordnance Survey.) Geo-coordinates	Notes	Entry number (Note: The "List Entry Number" is a unique number assigned to each listed building and scheduled monument by Historic England.)	Image	Wikidata
Church of St Rumwold	I				27 November 1957	TR0571534426; 51°04′20″N 0°56′06″E		1071194	Church of St Rumwold More images	Q17582893
Headstone to William Jordan About 10 Metres South East of Church of St Rumwold	II				10 August 1988	TR0572934415; 51°04′20″N 0°56′07″E		1184908	Upload Photo	Q26480218
Thatched Cottage	II				28 February 1989	TR0511835886; 51°05′08″N 0°55′39″E		1238051	Upload Photo	Q26531138
The Old Oak	II				10 August 1988	TR0711932874; 51°03′28″N 0°57′15″E		1071195	Upload Photo	Q26326186
Pinn Farmhouse	II	Bonnington Cross			10 August 1988	TR0555835147; 51°04′44″N 0°56′00″E		1184913	Upload Photo	Q26480223
Cherry Orchard Cottage	II	Cherry Orchard Lane			10 August 1988	TR0519935757; 51°05′04″N 0°55′42″E		1071196	Upload Photo	Q26326187

== See also ==
- Grade I listed buildings in Kent
- Grade II* listed buildings in Kent

== Sources ==
- Newman, John (2012) [1969], Kent: West and the Weald, The Buildings of England, New Haven and London: Yale University Press, ISBN 978-0-300-18509-6
