= Orlestone =

Civil parish in Kent, England

Coordinates: 51.0656°N 0.8626°E

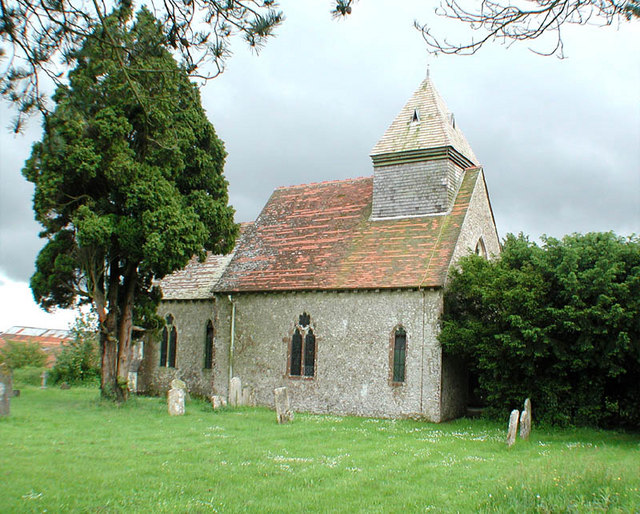
- St Mary the Virgin church

- Location within Kent
- Area: 7.91 km^{2} (3.05 sq mi)
- Population: 1,593 (Civil Parish 2021)
  - Density: 201/km^{2} (520/sq mi)
- OS grid reference: TR005335
- Civil parish: Orlestone
- District: Ashford
- Shire county: Kent
- Region: South East
- Country: England
- Sovereign state: United Kingdom
- Post town: Ashford
- Postcode district: TN26
- Dialling code: 01233
- Police: Kent
- Fire: Kent
- Ambulance: South East Coast
- UK Parliament: Weald of Kent

Orlestone is a mid-sized civil parish in Ashford District, Kent, England, with a population of 1,593. The centre of the parish is Hamstreet village which falls almost entirely within it but has a small fraction in the parish of Warehorne. The civil parish here reflects the very longstanding dominance of Orlestreet as its ecclesiastical parish boundary and provides a third alternative to most residents of Hamstreet to their village name, other than 'Ham Street'. Hamstreet is bypassed by the A2070 road, six miles south of Ashford.

== Description ==
Most of the population live in a cross-civil parish settlement at the middle and edge of Orlestone, which is Hamstreet.

Orlestone itself is a small hamlet with a typical short street number of houses and the medieval parish church of St Mary the Virgin, parts of which date to the 11th century. Much of the population moved to Hamstreet (originally known as Ham) when the Ashford to Hastings railway opened in 1853; there was also a better source of water at the newer place.

Eponymous places in the civil parish are Orlestone Forest, and buildings such as Orlestone Grange and Orlestone Riding Centre (near Shadoxhurst). Also a neighbourhood of Hamstreet built in 2006 has been named Orlestone View, in addition to the already existing Orlestone Villas and Orlestone Rise.

As with Warehorne the north of the area is forested.

== Transport ==
Ham Street railway station is central to Hamstreet and is also in approximately the midpoint of this parish.

Hamstreet is also served by the 11/11A/11B bus, which is operated by Stagecoach and runs from Ashford to Lydd and New Romney.

== See also ==
- Listed buildings in Orlestone
