= Church of St Nicholas, Pluckley =

Church in Pluckley, Kent

Church of St Nicholas
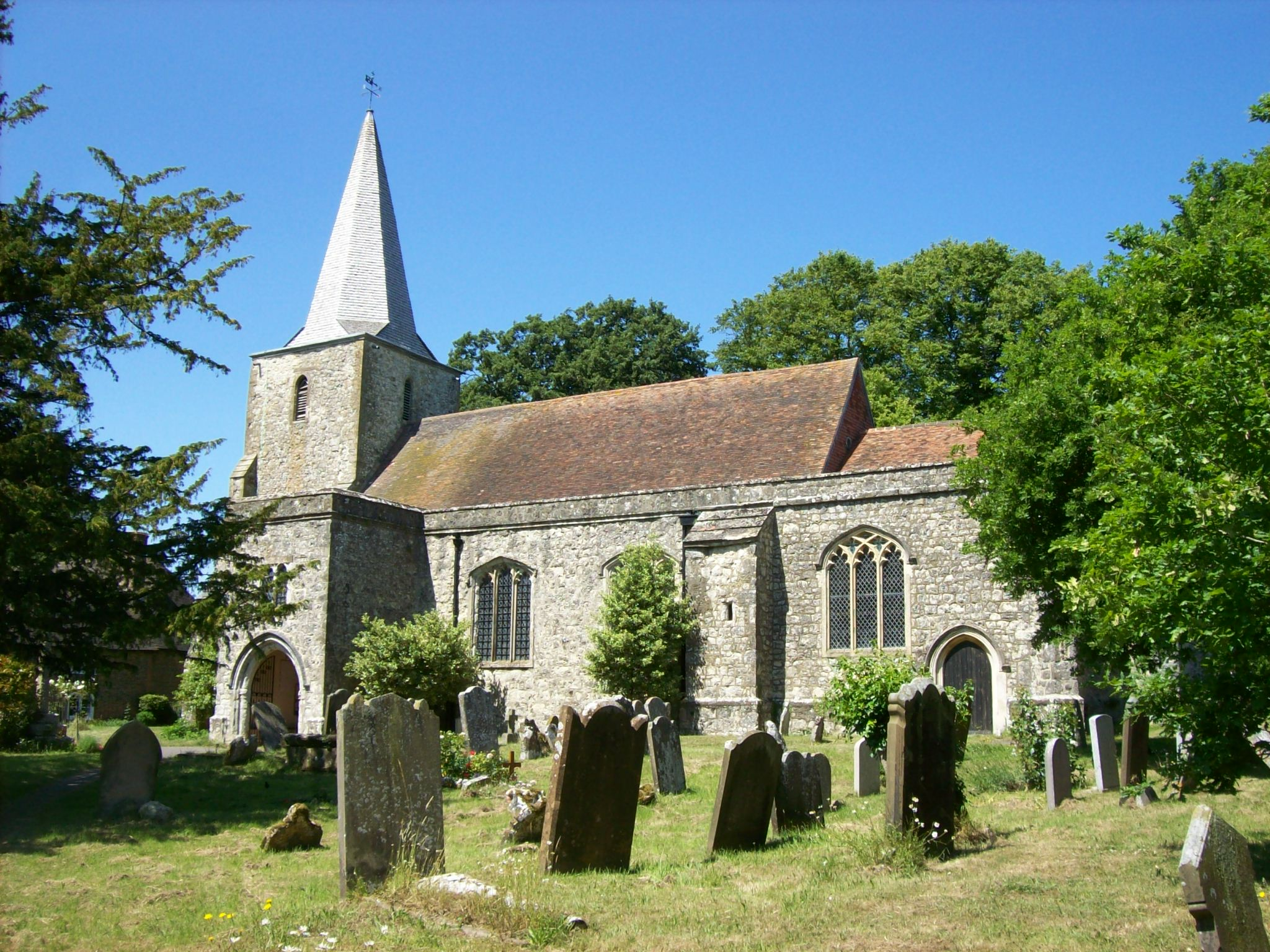
- The Church of St Nicholas, Pluckley
- Church of St Nicholas
- 51.17512°N 0.75499°E
- OS grid reference: TQ 92669 45351
- Location: Kent
- Country: England
- Denomination: Anglican

Architecture
- Heritage designation: Grade I

Administration
- Diocese: Canterbury
- Deanery: Ashford
- Parish: Calehill

The Church of St Nicholas, Pluckley is an Anglican church located in Pluckley, Kent in England. There was a church at this site as early as the late 11th century. The present building dates to the 13th or 14th centuries. The church was remodeled in the 15th century, when the south chapel, the south aisle and porch were added. There are nine medieval and Tudor brass memorial plaques inside the church, many commemorating the Dering family of Surrenden. St Nicholas' church is a Grade I listed building.

== Description and history ==
The Church of St Nicholas, Pluckley is located in Pluckley, Kent in England. There was a church at Pluckley as early as 1090 AD. The church was constructed with Kent ragstone. The chancel, nave and tower of St Nicholas dates to the 14th century. The current church's oldest section is the north-west corner of the nave, which dates to the Norman period. The chancel contains a piscina and a double sedilia. The chancel, door, tower window and spire were added in the 14th century. The east end has a pair of blocked lancet windows dating from before the 13th century. The spire was added in the 14th century, as were the chancel, door and tower window. The south chapel, the south aisle and porch were added in the 15th century.

The Dering or South Chapel, at the east end of the south aisle and divided from the rest of the church by two screens, was built in 1475. The church was renovated and expanded in the 15th century. The font, bearing the arms of the Dering family of Surrenden was built during the renovation. A wooden screen dating to 1635 separates the Dering chapel and the south aisle. There are several medieval and Tudor brass memorial plaques in the nave, many commemorating the Dering family. The oldest plaque is that of John Dering, who died in 1425. The burial ground contains 18th century chest tombs and early 18th to 19th century gravestones.

The church was designated a Grade I listed building in 1967.

== Parish church ==
Pluckley is one of seven parishes that form the Benefice of Calehill with Westwell. Other parish churches include Charing and Charing Heath, Egerton, Hothfield, Little Chart and Westwell. Services are held every Sunday at the Church of St Nicholas.
