= Patrick Woods-Scawen =

Royal Air Force officer

Patrick Philip Woods-Scawen
- Born: 29 June 1916; Karachi, British India
- Died: 1 September 1940 (aged 24); Kenley, England
- Relatives: Anthony Woods-Scawen
- Military career
- Allegiance: United Kingdom
- Branch: Royal Air Force
- Service years: 1937–1940
- Rank: Flying Officer
- Unit: No. 85 Squadron
- Conflicts: Second World War: Battle of France; Battle of Britain †
- Awards: Distinguished Flying Cross

Patrick Woods-Scawen DFC (29 June 1916 – 1 September 1940) was a British flying ace who served in the Royal Air Force (RAF) during the Second World War. He was credited with having shot down at least thirteen aircraft.

Born in British India, Woods-Scawen joined the RAF in 1937. After his training was completed, he was posted to No. 85 Squadron. He flew Hawker Hurricane fighters in the Battle of France, during which he claimed his first aerial victories. He was subsequently awarded the Distinguished Flying Cross in recognition of his successes in France. HE achieved further success during the Battle of Britain but was killed on 1 September when his parachute failed to open after he baled out of his aircraft when it was damaged in an engagement with German fighters. His brother Anthony, also a fighter pilot with the RAF, was killed the next day.

== Early life ==
Patrick Philip Woods-Scawen was born on 29 June 1916 in Karachi, India, the son of Philip Neri and Kathleen Florence Woods-Scawen. He and his younger brother Tony returned to the family home in Farnborough, Hampshire in 1924. He was educated at the Salesian College, Farnborough.

Woods-Scawen joined the Royal Air Force on a short service commission in October 1937. This was granted in January 1938, and he was posted to No. 11 Flying Training School at Wittering on 9 January 1938 and joined No. 85 Squadron on 20 August. Based at Debden and equipped with Gloster Gladiator fighters, a few weeks later it began to reequip with the Hawker Hurricane fighter.

== Second World War ==
On the outbreak of the Second World War, No. 85 Squadron was sent to France as part of the Air Component of the British Expeditionary Force (BEF). It flew patrols and was occasionally called upon to intercept intruding Luftwaffe aircraft from its bases in Lille-Seclin and Merville. It saw little action until 10 May 1940, when the Battle of France, the German invasion, commenced. The squadron was immediately and frequently engaged.

=== Battle of France ===
On the opening day of the battle, Woods-Scawen destroyed a Henschel Hs 126 reconnaissance aircraft and shared in the destruction of a Junkers Ju 88 medium bomber near St Armand. The next day, 11 May, he was one of three pilots that combined to destroy a Dornier Do 17 medium bomber. On 17 May he shot down a Messerschmitt Bf 109. Two days later he destroyed one Bf 109 and probably a second near Sechin, and then in subsequent sorties shot down two more Bf 109s, near Tournai and Lille respectively. However, he himself was shot down during the latter engagement and baled out of his stricken aircraft with minor wounds. Due to losses, the squadron withdrew to Debden on 22 May.

Shortly afterwards Woods-Scawen was promoted to flying officer. In recognition of his successes in France, Woods-Scawen was awarded the Distinguished Flying Cross. The public announcement was made on 25 June and the citation, published in the London Gazette read:

During May 1940, this officer destroyed six enemy aircraft and assisted in the destruction of others. On one occasion, although heavily outnumbered, he attacked without hesitation a large formation of enemy aircraft, shooting down two of them. His own aircraft was hit by a cannon shell and he was slightly wounded, but succeeded in escaping by parachute and rejoining his unit. He has displayed great courage, endurance and leadership.

— London Gazette, No. 34881, 25 June 1940.

=== Battle of Britain ===
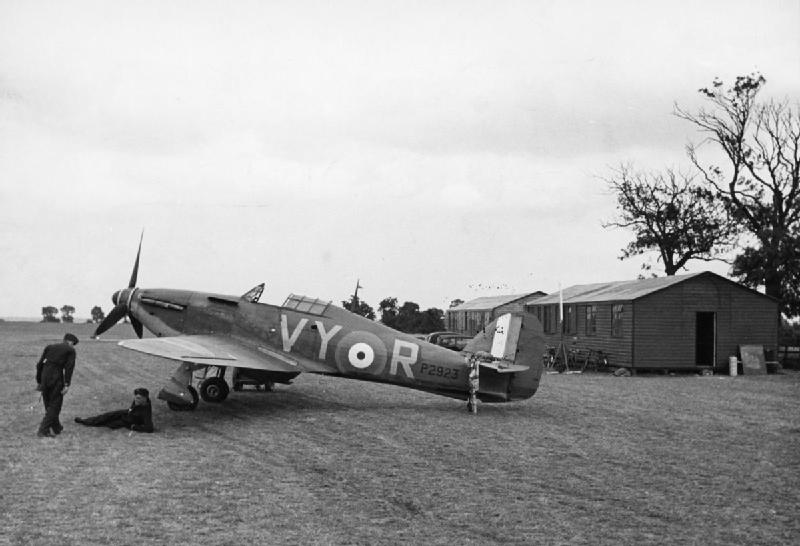
A Hawker Hurricane of No. 85 Squadron at an airfield in England, July 1940

Once No. 85 Squadron returned to operations after refitting from its campaign in France, it was tasked with intercepting Luftwaffe bombers over Kent and the Thames Estuary. It became heavily engaged as the Luftwaffe escalated its operations against the southeast of England. On 29 July, Woods-Scawen claimed to have destroyed a Do 17 40 miles (64 km) miles east of Felixstowe but his own aircraft was damaged by return fire. His claim was not confirmed and in fact the Do 17 was able to return to its airfield in France, where it crash-landed. On 26 August he claimed a Bf 109 probably destroyed and shared in the shooting down of a Do 17, both near Maidstone. Two days later he shot down a Bf 109 near Dungeness. A Messerschmitt Bf 110 heavy fighter was shot down over Bethenden by Woods-Scawen on 30 August. On the last day of the month he destroyed three Bf 109s over South London.

Woods-Scawen was shot down during an engagement with Bf 109s in the Kenley area on 1 September. Although he baled out, he was killed when his parachute failed. His body was found in the grounds of The Ivies, Kenley Lane on 6 September. His younger brother Anthony, serving with No. 43 Squadron, was killed the day after Woods-Scawen, on 2 September.

Woods-Scawen is credited with the destruction of thirteen aircraft, three of which were shared with other pilots. Two further aircraft were claimed as destroyed but could not be verified. He is also believed to have probably destroyed one other aircraft. He is buried in St Mary's churchyard, Caterham on the Hill, Surrey.
