= Rumbold of Buckingham =

Anglo-Saxon infant saint (born and died 662)

Saint Rumwold (Also known as Rumbold, Rumwald, or Rumbald)
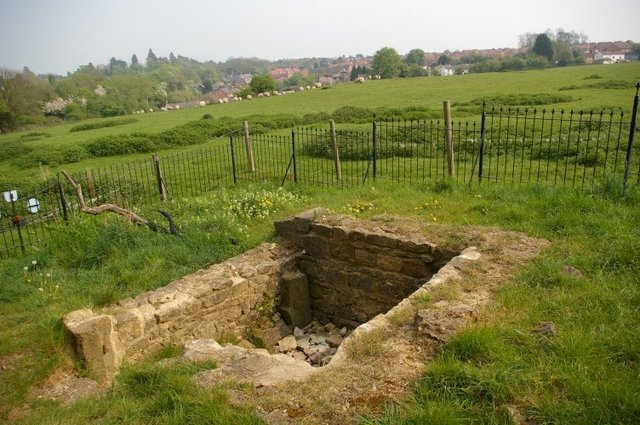
- St Rumbold's Well in Buckingham

Saint, Prince
- Born: 662 AD; Walton Grounds near King's Sutton, Northamptonshire
- Died: 662 AD (aged 3 days)
- Venerated in: Catholicism
- Feast: 3 November

Rumbold or Rumwold was a medieval infant saint in England, said to have lived for three days in 662. He is said to have been full of Christian piety despite his young age, and able to speak from the moment of his birth, professing his faith, requesting baptism, and delivering a sermon prior to his early death. Several churches were dedicated to him, of which at least four survive, one being at Pentridge in Dorset.

== Name ==
His name has a number of alternative spellings: Rumbold, Rumwald, Rumbald or Rumwold. Rumbold is the more common name used today, with streets in Buckingham and Lincoln being spelt this way.

== Hagiography ==
According to the 11th-century hagiography, Vita Sancti Rumwoldi, he was the grandson of Penda of Mercia (a pagan), and the son of a king of Northumbria. His parents are not actually named; the most likely candidates are Alhfrith, son of Oswiu of Northumbria, and his wife Cyneburh, daughter of Penda. But there are difficulties with this identification: Alhfrith never ruled Northumbria himself, unlike his father, only the subkingdom of Deira. Also the Northumbrian king is described as a pagan, but according to Bede, Alhfrith was a Christian and convinced Penda's son Peada to convert to Christianity too. Although it has been stated that Cyneburh is not known to have had any children, Northumbrian genealogy states she and Alhfrith had a further son, Osric, who subsequently became King of Northumbria himself.

In the Vita, Rumwold's mother is described as a pious Christian who, when married to a pagan king, tells him that she will not consummate the marriage until he converts to Christianity; he does so, and she becomes pregnant. The two are called by Penda to come to him when the time of her birth is near, but she gives birth during the journey, and immediately after being born the infant is said to have cried out: Christianus sum, christianus sum, christianus sum [transl. I am a Christian, I am a Christian, I am a Christian]. He went on to further profess his faith, to request baptism, and to ask to be named "Rumwold", afterwards giving a sermon. He predicted his own death, and said where he wanted his body to be laid to rest, in Buckingham.

Rumwold is reported to have been born in Walton Grounds, near King's Sutton in Northamptonshire, which was at that time part of the Mercian royal estates, possessing a court house and other instruments of government. The field in which he was born, where a chapel once stood on the supposed spot, may still be seen. King's Sutton parish church claims that its Saxon or Norman font may well have been the one where Rumwold was baptised. Rumwold was baptized by Bishop Widerin.

There are two wells associated with his name: in Astrop, just outside King's Sutton, and at Brackley and Buckingham, where his relics once lay. Church dedications largely follow the missionary activity of Saint Wilfrid, but once spread as far as North Yorkshire, Lincoln, Essex and Dorset.

Boxley Abbey in Kent had a famous statue of the saint. It was small and of a weight so small a child could lift it, but at times it supposedly became so heavy even strong people could not lift it. According to tradition, only those could lift it who had never sinned. Upon the Dissolution of the Monasteries in England, it was discovered that the statue was held or released by a wooden pin by an unseen person behind the statue.

In 2005, the former church of Saint Rumwold in Lincoln, which is now a college, erected a plaque to celebrate the connection.

== St. Rumbold of Mechelen ==
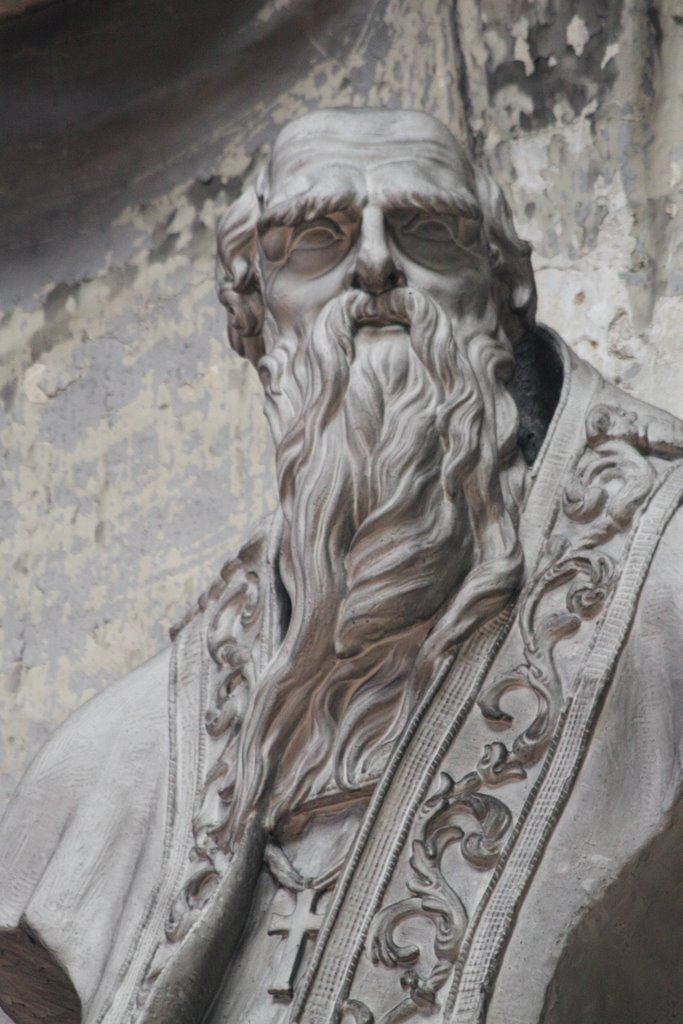
A statue of St. Rombout, Hanswijk Basilica, Mechelen

There has been some historical confusion between Rumwold of Buckingham and Rumbold of Mechelen. The latter is locally known by the Latin name Rumoldus and in particular his name in Dutch, Rombout (in French spelled as Rombaut), and assumedly never called Rumwold. His usual names in English are Rumold, Rumbold, Rombout, and Rombaut. A compilation about three saints' lives as translated by Rosalind Love shows that an unknown author "corrected" a 15th-century attribution as "martyr" (assumedly Rumbold, who was murdered in Mechelen) by annotating "confessor" .

== Sources ==
- Love, Rosalind C. (1996). Three Eleventh-Century Anglo-Latin Saint's Lives — Vita S. Birini, Vita et Miracula S. Kenelmi, Vita S. Rumwoldi. Clarendon Press, Oxford University Press. ISBN 9780198205241.
- Kirby, David P. (1991). The Earliest English Kings. London: Unwin Hyman. ISBN 0-04-445691-3.
