= Ivychurch =

Village in Kent, England

Coordinates: 51.0128°N 0.889°E

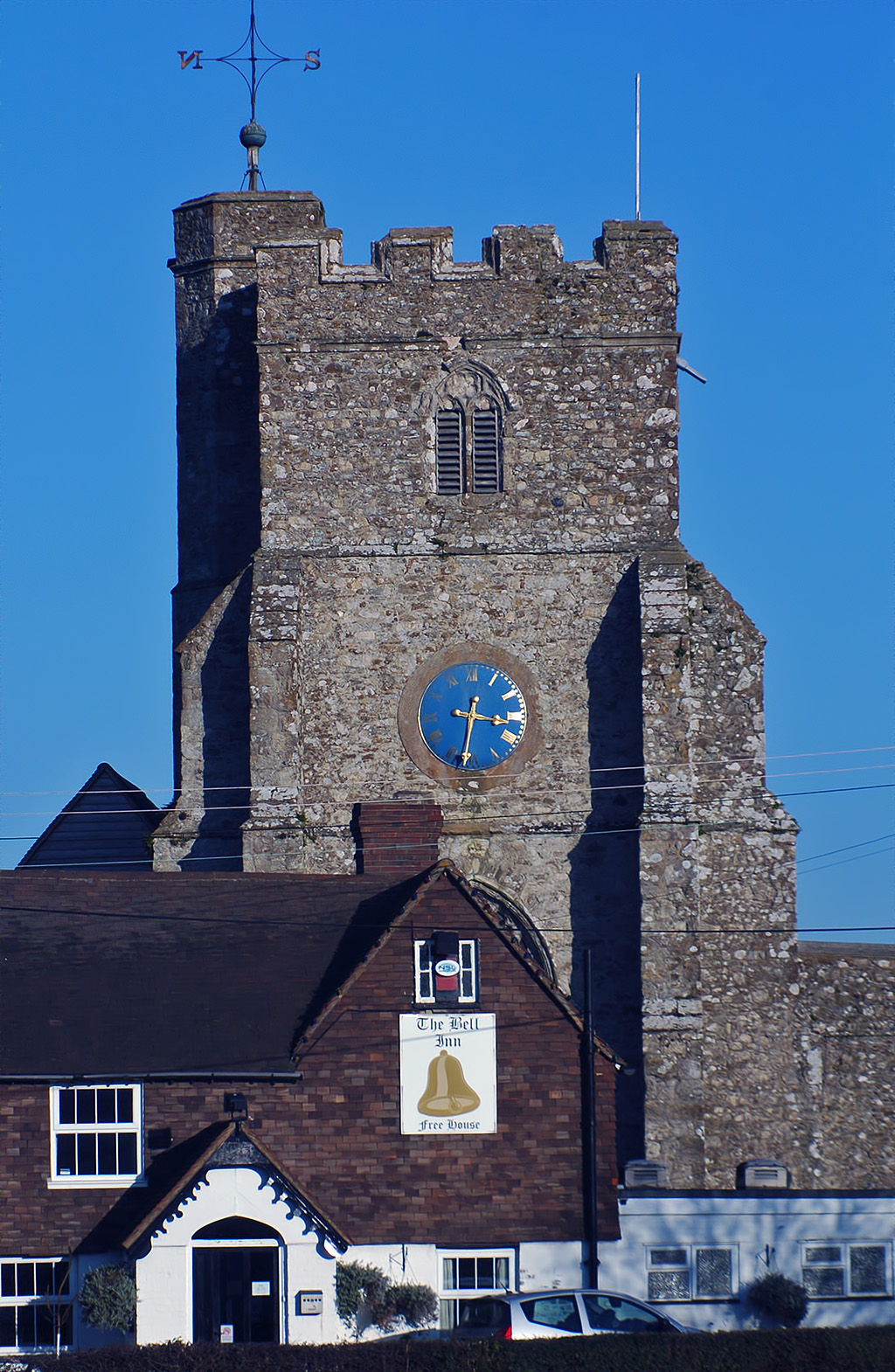
- St George's Ivychurch church tower

- Location within Kent
- Population: 253 (2011)
- OS grid reference: TR028277
- District: Folkestone and Hythe
- Shire county: Kent
- Region: South East
- Country: England
- Sovereign state: United Kingdom
- Post town: Romney Marsh
- Postcode district: TN29
- Police: Kent
- Fire: Kent
- Ambulance: South East Coast
- UK Parliament: Folkestone and Hythe

Ivychurch is a village and civil parish in the Folkestone and Hythe district of Kent, England. The village is located on the Romney Marsh, three miles (4.8 km) north-west of New Romney. The parish council consists of five members.

The parish is huge and spreads across the marsh down to the Kent ditch (the boundary between Kent and East Sussex) although its population is only some 170, 50% of whom live in the village. The shape of the parish is rather unusual as it follows the parcels of land to the south-west which were progressively 'inned' (drained) in the 12th century onwards.

Due to its size and space, St. George's is known as 'the Cathedral of Romney Marsh' and is mainly a 14th-century building with a seven bay arcade built in the late Decorated style of English architecture. The body of the church dates from around 1360 with the Perpendicular-style tower and west end being added about 100 years later. There are some remains/ reminders of an earlier, Early English, church which are mainly found at the east end and the first Rector is recorded as taking up his post in 1242. The building is mainly constructed of Kentish ragstone but some Caen stone from the earlier church can also be found as can many wave-rolled flints which are a reminder of the close proximity of the English Channel. The nave is particularly impressive as it is empty of seats and the space is put to uses such as exhibitions, concerts, barn dances and the annual Harvest Supper. The recently restored north aisle (originally a Lady chapel) is now a Museum of Rural Life.

The pub, The Bell Inn, acts as a centre point for many village activities, hosting local morris men groups and inviting many local musicians to showcase their talents. The Bell presents a very popular beer and cider festival every year.

The Main Street through the village used to be part of the B2070 road from New Romney to Hamstreet and Ashford. The road has been unclassified since the 1990s.
