= Warehorne =

Village in Kent, England

Coordinates: 51.0609°N 0.8352°E

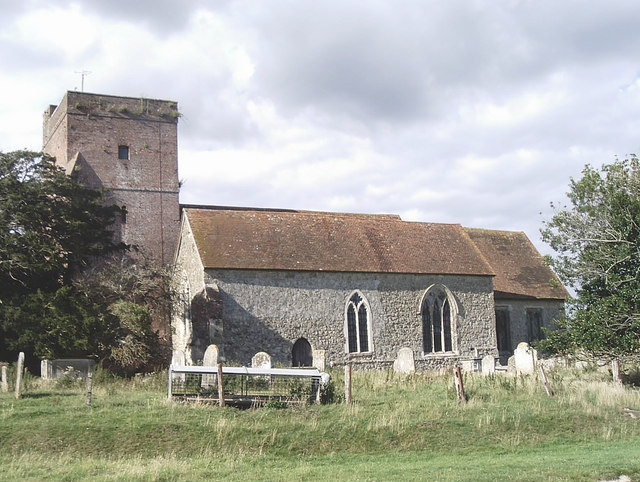
- St Matthew's Church

- Location within Kent
- Area: 10.66 km^{2} (4.12 sq mi)
- Population: 395 (2021)(Civil Parish)
  - Density: 37/km^{2} (96/sq mi)
- OS grid reference: TQ986329
- Civil parish: Warehorne
- District: Ashford
- Shire county: Kent
- Region: South East
- Country: England
- Sovereign state: United Kingdom
- Post town: Ashford
- Postcode district: TN26
- Dialling code: 01233
- Police: Kent
- Fire: Kent
- Ambulance: South East Coast
- UK Parliament: Weald of Kent

Warehorne is a village and civil parish in the south of the Ashford Borough of Kent, England. It is a scattered community centred on the Hamstreet to Tenterden road (B2067) around seven miles SSW of Ashford. The Royal Military Canal passes through the south of the civil parish.

The first recorded mention of Warehorne is in an Anglo-Saxon charter of Ecgberht, King of Wessex of 820 AD, where it is called Werehornas.

The Domesday Book of 1086 mentions Warehorne by name and states that a church existed there. The present church (St Matthew's) shows no sign of Saxon or of Norman work.

Warehorne was also where Reverend Richard Harris Barham, the author of The Ingoldsby Legends, resided for a short while.

== Geography ==
The settlement is in four main parts:

- The main part of Warehorne is near the central village green. It includes the Grade I-listed St Matthew's Church and The Woolpack Inn.
- A second part of the village is known as the Leacon. This is sited at the crossroads on the B2067 and contains the former schoolhouse and now abandoned cricket field.
- The remainder of mostly forested Warehorne (one third of the area and all in the northern half) contains the former World's Wonder pub and borders on the village of Kenardington.
- Part of the larger village of Hamstreet falls within Warehorne's parish boundaries, enabling the village to have sufficient population to retain its own civil parish council. The Saxon Shore Way links Warehorne with Hamstreet where the nearest shops and railway station can be found.

== See also ==
- Listed buildings in Warehorne
