= Hamstreet =

Village in Kent, England

Coordinates: 51.0656°N 0.8626°E

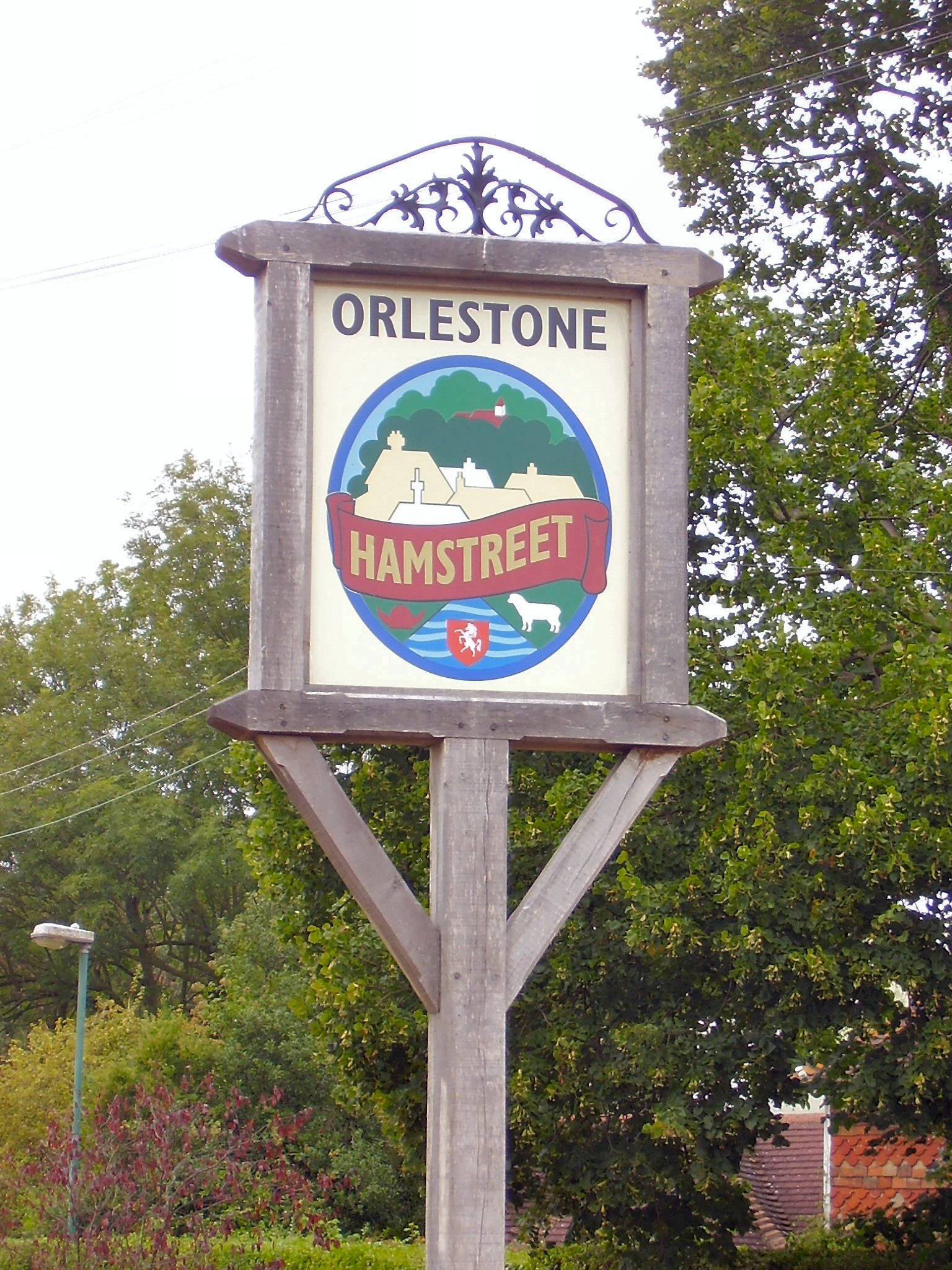
- Village sign of Orlestone and Hamstreet

- Location within Kent
- Population: 1,988
- OS grid reference: TR005335
- Civil parish: Orlestone and Warehorne
- District: Ashford
- Shire county: Kent
- Region: South East
- Country: England
- Sovereign state: United Kingdom
- Post town: Ashford
- Postcode district: TN26
- Dialling code: 01233
- Police: Kent
- Fire: Kent
- Ambulance: South East Coast
- UK Parliament: Weald of Kent

Hamstreet is a village in Kent, in South East England.

The village is located 6 miles (10 km) south of Ashford on the A2070, the main road between Ashford and Hastings. The majority of the village is in the parish of Orlestone, named after a much older hamlet located 1 mile north of Hamstreet on the ridge of hills; however, part of the village falls within the parish of Warehorne, including the significant Ingoldsby Lane / Pippins development, giving a total population of 1,988 which will have increased since the 2021 census.

The parish church, dedicated to the Good Shepherd, is now a shared Anglican/Methodist building, and the parish churches of Orlestone, Snave (now a redundant church), Ruckinge, Warehorne and Kenardington are all within the traditional benefice which was expanded to form the new Saxon Shore benefice along with Bilsington, Bonnington and Aldington.

== History ==
Parts of the parish church of St Mary the Virgin, Orlestone date back to the 11th century. Until the coming of the railway in 1851, Hamstreet was just a hamlet known as 'Ham' based around the village centre which contains many buildings in the traditional Kentish weatherboard style. The village expanded rapidly during the 20th century and had its moment of fame in 1991, when maps of Hamstreet at various stages in history were used on a series of postage stamps to mark 200 years of the Ordnance Survey – this arose as the Hamstreet area was the first to be mapped in this way. An episode of BBC TV's Countryfile was also devoted to the occasion. The village also featured in a mountaineering spoof in Blue Peter to raise money for charity.

Although from the 1970s onwards there has been a loss of some traditional village outlets, there are still a number of shops and places to eat and drink in the village, as well as a school, doctor's surgery, dental clinic and sports facilities. The village is twinned with the village of Thérouanne in northern France.

== Countryside ==
Two large areas of public woodland surround the village, namely Ham Street Woods and Orlestone Forest, Sites of Special Scientific Interest (SSSIs). Both are remnants of the ancient forest that once covered the whole of the Weald of Kent. The Royal Military Canal, the UK's third longest defensive structure, passes by ½ mile to the south. Three long distance footpaths also run through the parish:

- The Saxon Shore Way
- Greensand Way (which begins at the main crossroads and runs for 110 miles (177 km) to Haslemere, Surrey)
- The Royal Military Canal Path

The area is also popular with cyclists, as Romney Marsh to the south is completely flat.

== Transport ==
Ham Street railway station opened in 1851. It was designed by William Trees and is in an Italianate style built in red brick. The village was bypassed by the A2070 road in 1994 and is situated on the B2067. It is served by a bus service between Ashford and Romney Marsh.
