= Stone-cum-Ebony =

Civil parish in Kent, England

Coordinates: 51.0167°N 0.7654°E

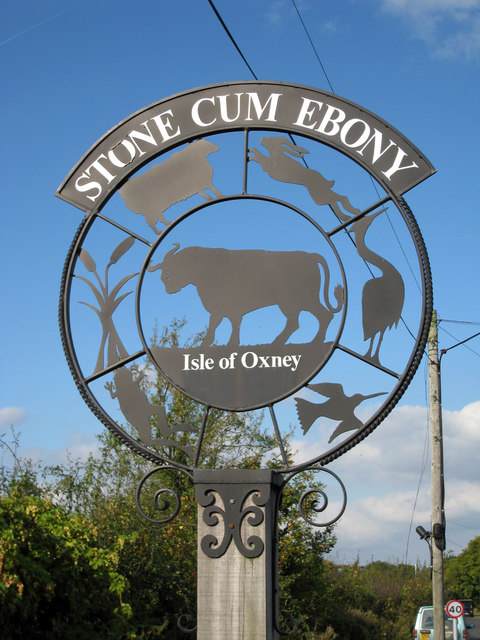

- Location within Kent
- Area: 19.18 km^{2} (7.41 sq mi)
- Population: 460 (Civil Parish 2011)
  - Density: 24/km^{2} (62/sq mi)
- OS grid reference: TQ939278
- Civil parish: Stone-cum-Ebony
- District: Ashford
- Shire county: Kent
- Region: South East
- Country: England
- Sovereign state: United Kingdom
- Post town: Tenterden
- Postcode district: TN30
- Dialling code: 01233
- Police: Kent
- Fire: Kent
- Ambulance: South East Coast
- UK Parliament: Weald of Kent
- Website: Stone-cum-Ebony Parish Council

Stone-cum-Ebony is a large mostly rural and marshland civil parish centred 7 miles (11 km) SSW of Ashford, in the Ashford district, in Kent, England. It includes the village of Stone in Oxney and small community of Ebony. In 2011, it had a population of 460.

== Geography ==
The parish is south east of Tenterden, and stands mostly slightly elevated on the eastern side of the Isle of Oxney.

The Saxon Shore Way, a long-distance walking route tracing the old Saxon shoreline, passes through the parish. Wholly within the greater Isle of Oxney, the far north of the parish is marked by a small tributary of the Rother. It has one long street lined community at its centre.

== History ==
Being almost flat and rectangular in area, the current bounds are those reflecting the centuries-old church parish boundaries: the south-east of the parish has the Royal Military Canal which helps to drain what was otherwise an almost impenetrable marsh, and the west of the parish reaches to include about a quarter of Wittersham village centre. Its Baptist chapel in the north of the street is now a cottage. The remaining religious building is a Grade II* church, i.e. mid-ranked in the national listed building ranking system. 10 other buildings, nearly half of those on the main street, are listed.

== Notable residents (past & present) ==
- Lord Clarke of Stone-cum-Ebony JSC, Supreme Court Justice
- George Digweed MBE, 16× World Sporting Shooter Champion
- Norman Forbes-Robertson, distinguished Victorian Shakespearean actor
- Dave McKean, illustrator, photographer, comic book artist, graphic designer, filmmaker and musician
- George Newson, composer
- Sinden family:
  - Sir Donald Sinden CBE, actor
  - Marc Sinden, film director, actor and West End theatre producer

== See also ==
- Listed buildings in Stone-cum-Ebony
