= Ebony, Kent =

Hamlet in Kent, England

Coordinates: 51.0167°N 0.7654°E

Ebony
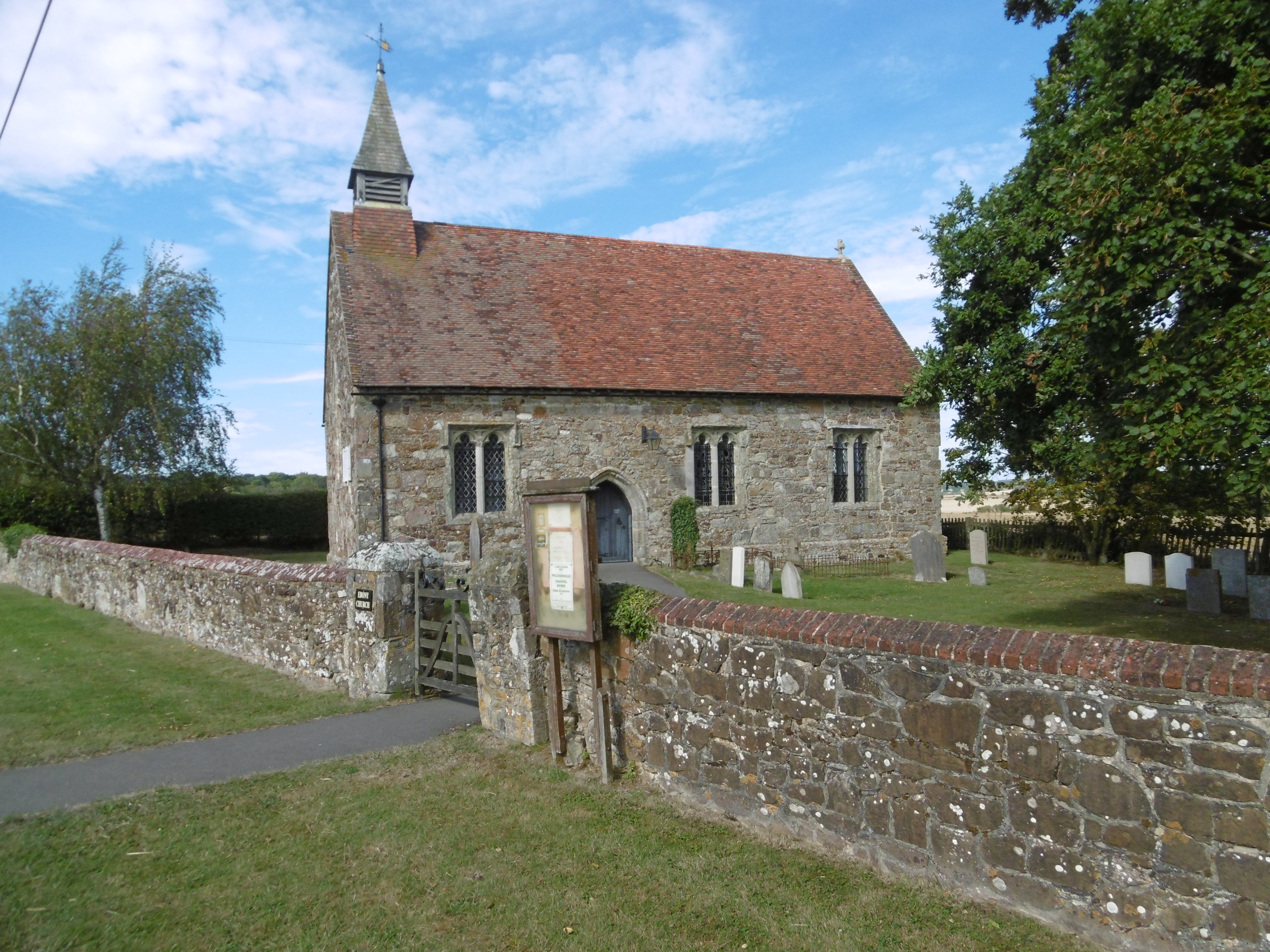

- Location within Kent
- OS grid reference: TQ939278
- Civil parish: Stone-cum-Ebony
- District: Ashford
- Shire county: Kent
- Region: South East
- Country: England
- Sovereign state: United Kingdom
- Post town: TENTERDEN
- Postcode district: TN30
- Dialling code: 01233
- Police: Kent
- Fire: Kent
- Ambulance: South East Coast
- UK Parliament: Weald of Kent

Ebony is a hamlet in the civil parish of Stone-cum-Ebony, in the Ashford district, in the county of Kent, England. It is on the Isle of Oxney, south of Ashford. Ebony St. Mary is a parish, in the union of Tenterden, partly in the hundred of Tenterden, Lower division of the lathe of Scray, W. division, but chiefly in the hundred of Oxney, lathe of Shepway, E. division, of Kent, 4 miles south-east from Tenterden.

The place-name 'Ebony' is first attested in a Saxon charter of 833, where it appears as Ebbanea. The name means 'Ebba's or Ybba's stream'.

In 1891 the parish had a population of 174. In 1894 the parish was abolished and merged with Stone to form "Stone cum Ebony", part also went to Tenterden.

== Notable residents (past & present) ==
- Norman Forbes-Robertson – distinguished Victorian Shakespearean actor
- Dave McKean – illustrator, photographer, comic book artist, graphic designer, filmmaker and musician
- Sir Donald Sinden CBE – distinguished actor
- Marc Sinden – film director, actor and West End theatre producer
- Maria Ann Smith – orchardist and cultivator of the Granny Smith apple was married here.

Ebony was formerly an island surrounded by marsh and the tidal waters of the River Rother. At the top of the most prominent part of the high ground, known as Chapel Bank, is the churchyard of the original Ebony Church, St Mary the Virgin. After lightning and fire damage the remains of the church, built of local ragstone, were moved in 1858 to the present location at nearby Reading Street, and restored. It has been suggested that references to King Osred II of Northumbria's exile at 'Ebonia' (Evania) in the Annals of Roger of Hoveden may refer to the strategically situated Ebony in the marshlands of the South Coast, rather than to the Isle of Man or the Hebrides. The fact that the church at Ebony was of Saxon foundation has been cited in support for this hypothesis; however there is no evidence for a 9th-century date for the church and the earliest reference is from 1070.

An annual pilgrimage from the Reading Street site of the church to the original site on Chapel Bank occurs in September.

The nearby church of the village of Stone-cum-Ebony, on the Isle of Oxney, is also dedicated to St Mary the Virgin, and should not be confused with Ebony church
