= Thomas Braddock =

Thomas Braddock may refer to:

- Tom Braddock (1887–1976), British politician
- Thomas Braddock (priest) (1556–1607), Anglican clergyman and author
