= Romney Marshes Area IDB =

Coordinates: 51.01°N 0.91°E

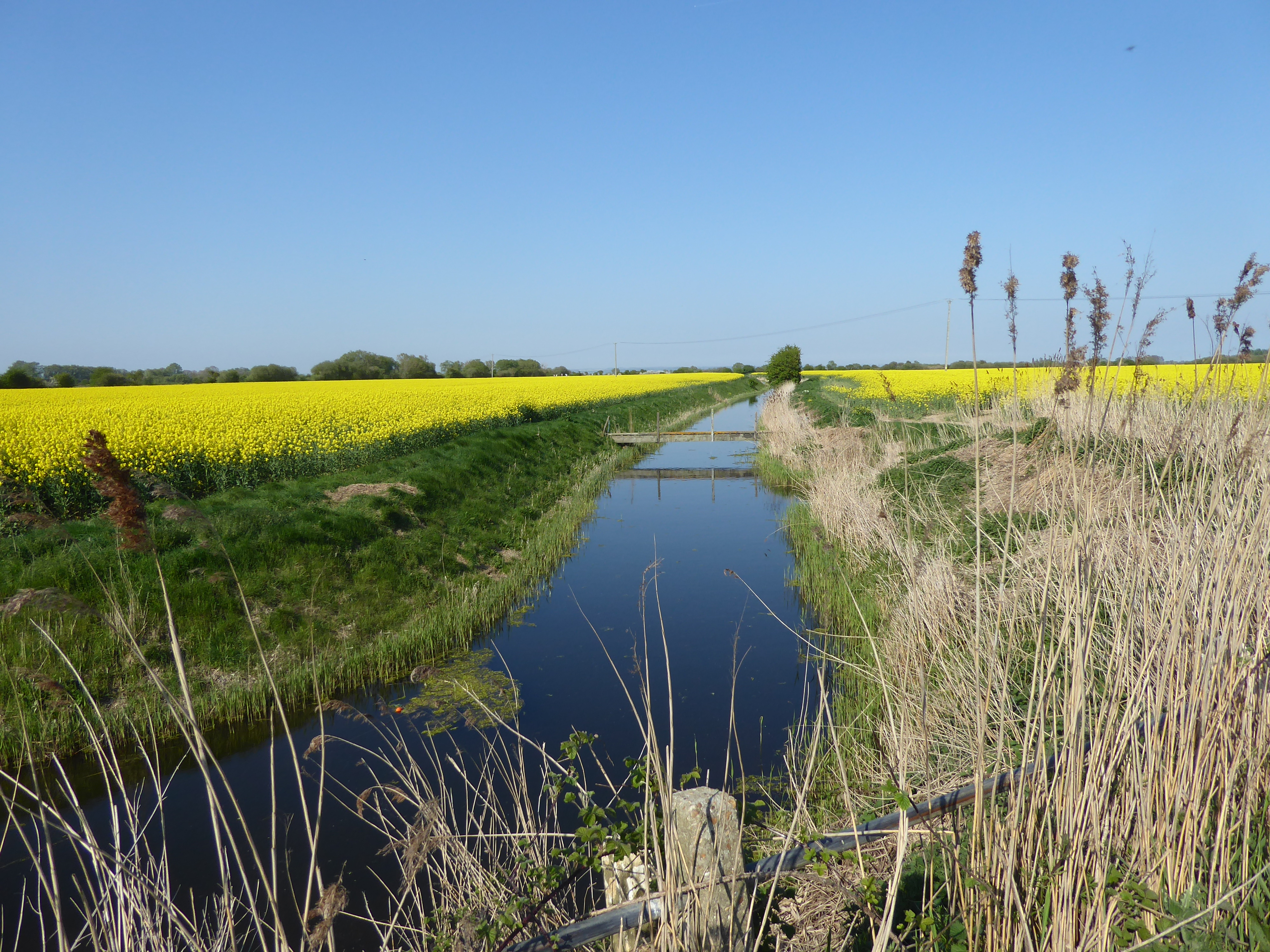
- White Kemp Sewer is one of many drainage channels on Romney Marsh

- Location within Kent
- OS grid reference: TR044279
- Shire county: Kent
- Region: South East
- Country: England
- Sovereign state: United Kingdom

Romney Marshes Area internal drainage board is the successor to a long line on organisations who have managed land drainage and flood defence on Romney Marsh in the counties of Kent and East Sussex in the south-east of England.

== History ==
Romney Marshes, along with The Fens and the Somerset Levels, is one of the three major areas of marshland in southern England. It covers some 100 square miles (260 km^{2}) of land, and stretches from Hythe in the north east to Fairlight in the south west. To the west, the marshland extends along the valleys of the River Rother, River Tillingham and River Brede. Most of it is low-lying, below the level of high tides, and is susceptible to flooding from the sea and from fresh water. To some extent, it is protected from the English Channel on its south and east sides by large banks of shingle, consisting of flint pebbles, but these are constantly being altered by wave action. Dungeness, at the south-eastern tip, is a large promontary made of shingle. The gaps between the shingle banks have been plugged with sea walls, built over centuries, without which most of the area would quickly revert to salt marsh. Furthest west is Pett Wall, followed by Broomhill Wall, while between Dungeness and Hythe are the Littlestone Wall and Dymchurch Wall.

Much of the marshes became the property of the Priory of Canterbury in the 9th century, when the lands owned by the double minster of Lyminge were transferred to Christ Church, Canterbury. In the early 1100s, Christ Church granted land near Appledore to tenants, who had to maintain sea walls and drainage ditches known as sewers to prevent salt and fresh water flooding the land. Another early reference to flood prevention occurred sometime between 1155 and 1167, when Prior Wilbert of Canterbury granted a tenancy on land in Misleham, now part of Brookland parish, to a man called Baldwin Scudaway for "all their land in Misleham which lies in the Marsh, in so far as Baldwin can inclose it against the sea". Baldwin was required to pay for the sea defences himself, and the main drainage channel near Misleham is still called Baldwin's Sewer.

The Doudeman family are one of the best-documented groups involved in reclamation of the marshes in the late 12th and early 13th centuries. They reclaimed a large swathe of land in the parish of Broomhill over four generations. Battle Abbey and Robertsbridge Abbey began buying up land, including some of the Doudeman's, shortly after 1200, and in 1222 joined forces to enclose another 1,400 acres (570 ha). The favourable weather conditions of this period were followed by a long period of stormy weather, and a document issued by them in 1243 stated that rent would no longer be payable if the land was overwhelmed by the sea. There are no surviving records of reclamation taking place subsequently.

A significant advance occurred in 1252, when Henry III issued the Charter of Romney Marsh. This prevented the Sheriff or his officers from taking any action which might prevent the Jurats of Romney Marsh from carrying out their responsibilities to protect the land from sea or fresh water flooding. This was one of the first pieces of legislation to recognise that land drainage was a bigger issue than could successfully be dealt with by individuals, and the resultant commission was the forerunner of many local authorities to control the drainage of low-lying areas of England. The charter allowed the Bailiff, Jurats and Commonality of the Marsh of Romney to levy rates, called scots, on occupants of the area to pay for maintaining the land drainage and sea defences, and this practice continued until 1932.

Extreme weather during the 13th century caused numerous issues in the marshes, and the processes for dealing with them were gradually formulated into the Laws and Customs of Romney Marsh. Subsequently, commissions dealing with a number of other areas of marshland in England commanded that they should be managed according to the laws and customs of Romney Marsh. Edward IV (Note: Source says Edward VI, but he was not reigning in 1462.) issued another charter to Romney Marsh Corporation in 1462, to introduce liberties which would enable the population to increase, as the area had become depopulated. The ruling body became known as the Lords, Bailiff, Jurats and Commonalty of the Level and Liberty of Romney Marsh, and they were empowered to raise taxes in addition to the scots. The next major advance was the passing of a Land Drainage Act by Henry VIII in 1531. This act created Commissions of Sewers in all of the marshlands of England, apart from Romney Marsh, where the existing system worked so well that the Lords, Bailiff and Jurats continued to manage the land as they had previously done.

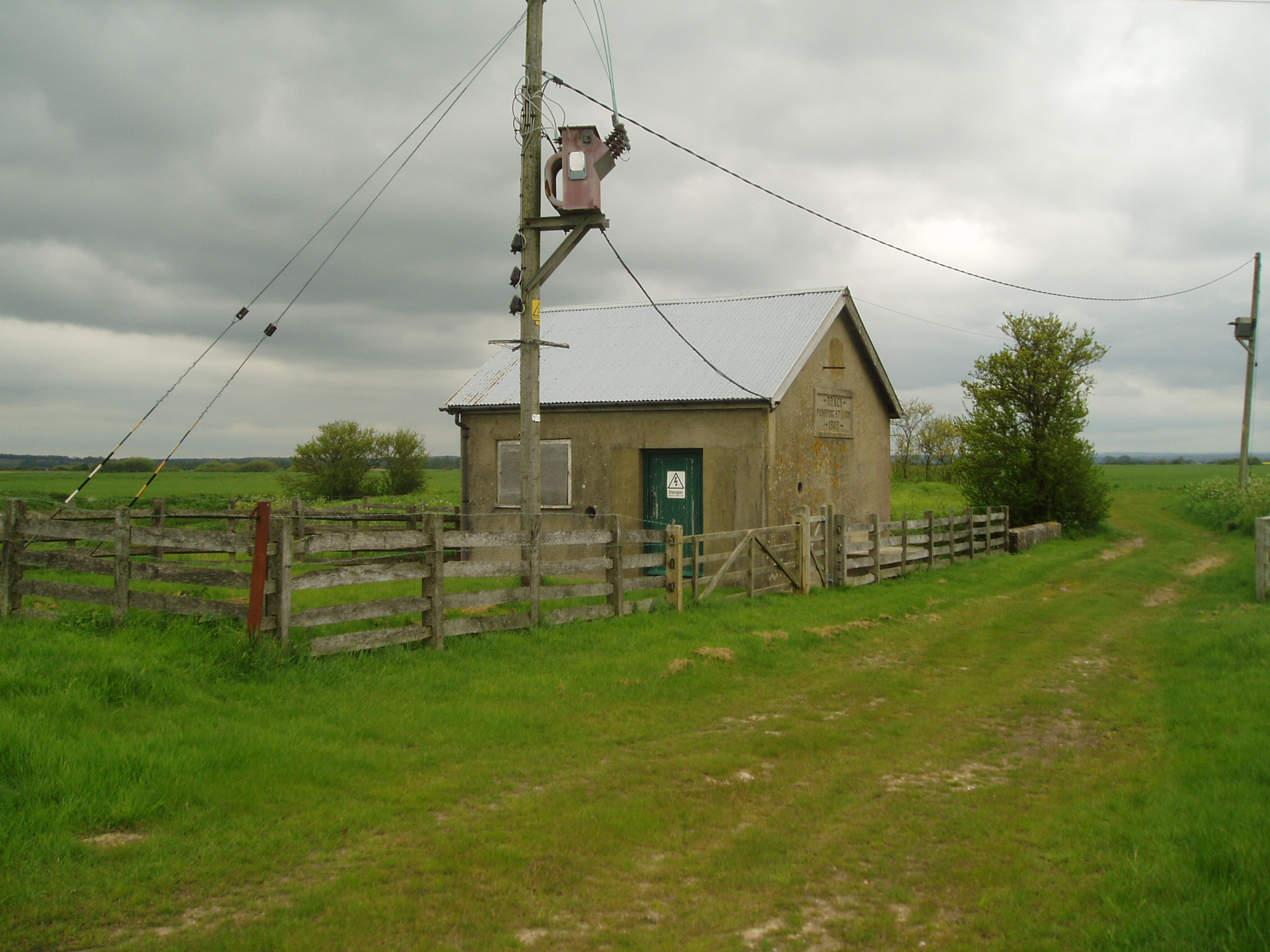
Brack pumping station, owned by the IDB, was built in 1909.

Following the passing of the Land Drainage Act 1930, Catchment Boards were set up to manage the main rivers. The Rother and Jury's Gut Catchment Board were responsible for the River Rother, the River Tillingham and the River Brede, while the Romney and Denge Marsh Main Drains Catchment Board were responsible for major waterways on the marsh itself. Within those catchment areas, internal drainage districts were created, to be managed by internal drainage boards (IDBs). They were responsible for the management of land drainage, and the network of channels that supported it. Six IDBs were created to manage the different areas of the marsh, but two of them amalgamated. The Romney Marsh Levels IDB managed the central area of the marsh, while Walland IDB managed Walland Marsh, bounded by Rye to the west, Lydd to the east and Brookland to the north. Denge and Southbrooks IDB managed Denge Marsh, to the east of Lydd, Pett IDB managed the Pett Level, to the south of Winchelsea, and Rother IDB were responsible for the land surrounding the River Rother, River Tillingham and River Brede. The Romney Marshes Area IDB was formed in April 2001, when these five boards amalgamated.

The IDB is responsible for an area of 130 square miles (340 km^{2}), although water drains into it from higher ground around its edges, resulting in a catchment area of 360 square miles (930 km^{2}). Much of the marsh is lower than the mean tide level, and would be flooded if it were not protected by sea walls. Within their area, they maintain 220 miles (350 km) of drainage ditches, which feed water to the main rivers. The IDB owns five pumping stations, but most of the ditches feed water to pumping stations owned by the Environment Agency. They manage a further 31 pumping stations, together with 201 miles (323 km) of main river and 82 miles (132 km) of embankments and flood walls. The IDB also maintains 140 structures which control water levels.

== Bibliography ==
- Botting, Nick (23 July 2012). "Presentation on the work of the Internal Drainage Board". Kent County Council. Archived from the original on 9 July 2024.
- Brooks, Nicholas (1988). Romney Marsh in the Early Middle Ages. In Eddison & Green 1988
- Dobson, Alban; Hull, Hubert (1931). The Land Drainage Act 1930. Oxford University Press.
- Eddison, Jill; Green, Christopher, eds. (1988). Romney Marsh: Evolution, Occupation, Reclamation. Oxford University Committee for Archaeology. ISBN 978-0-947816-24-7.
- Eddison, Jill (2000). Romney Marsh: Survival on a frontier. History Press. ISBN 978-0-7524-1486-7.
- Tatton-Brown, Tim (1988). The Topography of the Walland Marsh area between the 11th and 13th Centuries. In Eddison & Green 1988
- Wisdom, A S (1966). Land Drainage. London: Sweet & Maxwell.
