= Stone in Oxney =

Village in Kent, England

Coordinates: 51.0167°N 0.7654°E

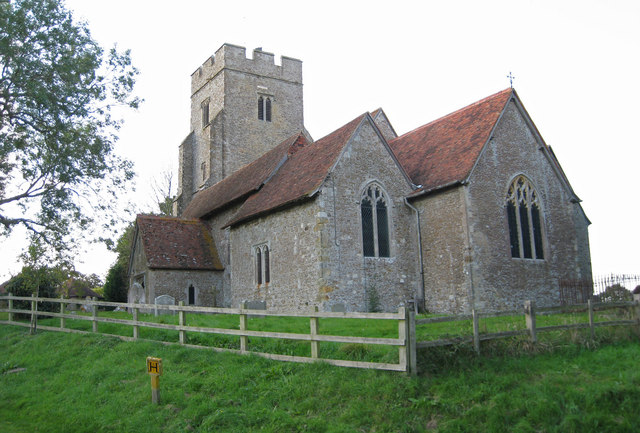
- St Mary's Church

- Location within Kent
- Population: 392 (2001) (Parish)
- OS grid reference: TQ939278
- Civil parish: Stone-cum-Ebony
- District: Ashford
- Shire county: Kent
- Region: South East
- Country: England
- Sovereign state: United Kingdom
- Post town: TENTERDEN
- Postcode district: TN30
- Dialling code: 01233
- Police: Kent
- Fire: Kent
- Ambulance: South East Coast
- UK Parliament: Weald of Kent

Stone in Oxney is a village in the civil parish of Stone-cum-Ebony, in the Ashford district, in the county of Kent, England. It is south of Ashford, near Appledore.

The village is 11 miles (18 km) south east of Tenterden, on the eastern side of the Isle of Oxney. The stone that gives the village its name is preserved in the village church, and is of Roman origin. Often thought to be an altar of Mithras, it in fact depicts Apis.

The Saxon Shore Way, a long-distance walking route tracing the old Saxon shoreline, passes through the parish.

In 1891 the parish of "Stone" had a population of 356. In 1894 the parish was abolished and merged with Ebony to form "Stone cum Ebony".

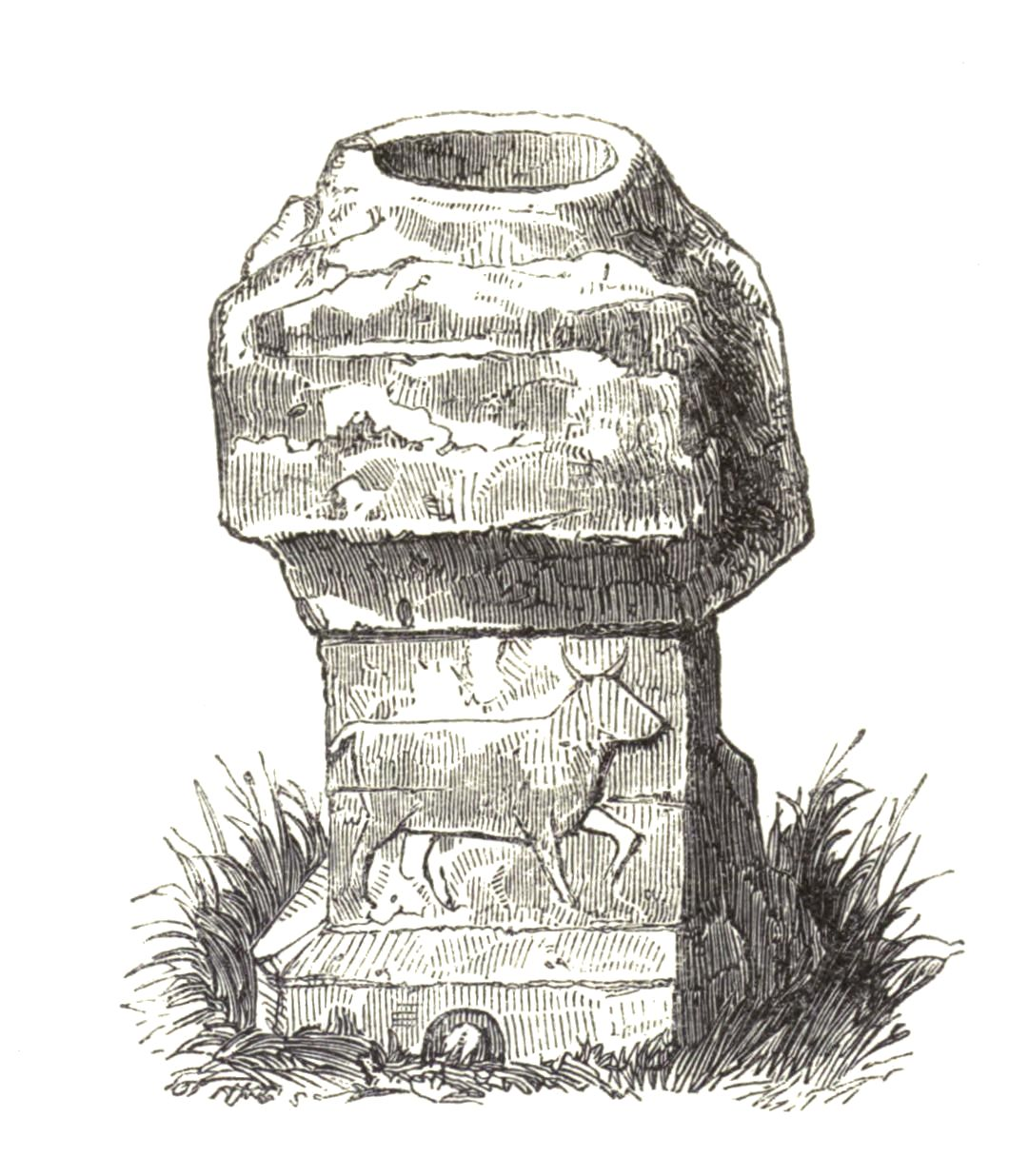
Roman Altar at Stone in the Isle of Oxney
