= Oxney =

Oxney may refer to:

- Isle of Oxney
- William Oxney, the name of two Members of Parliament for Great Yarmouth
