= Sedlescombe vineyard =

Coordinates: 50°57′35″N 0°31′46″E

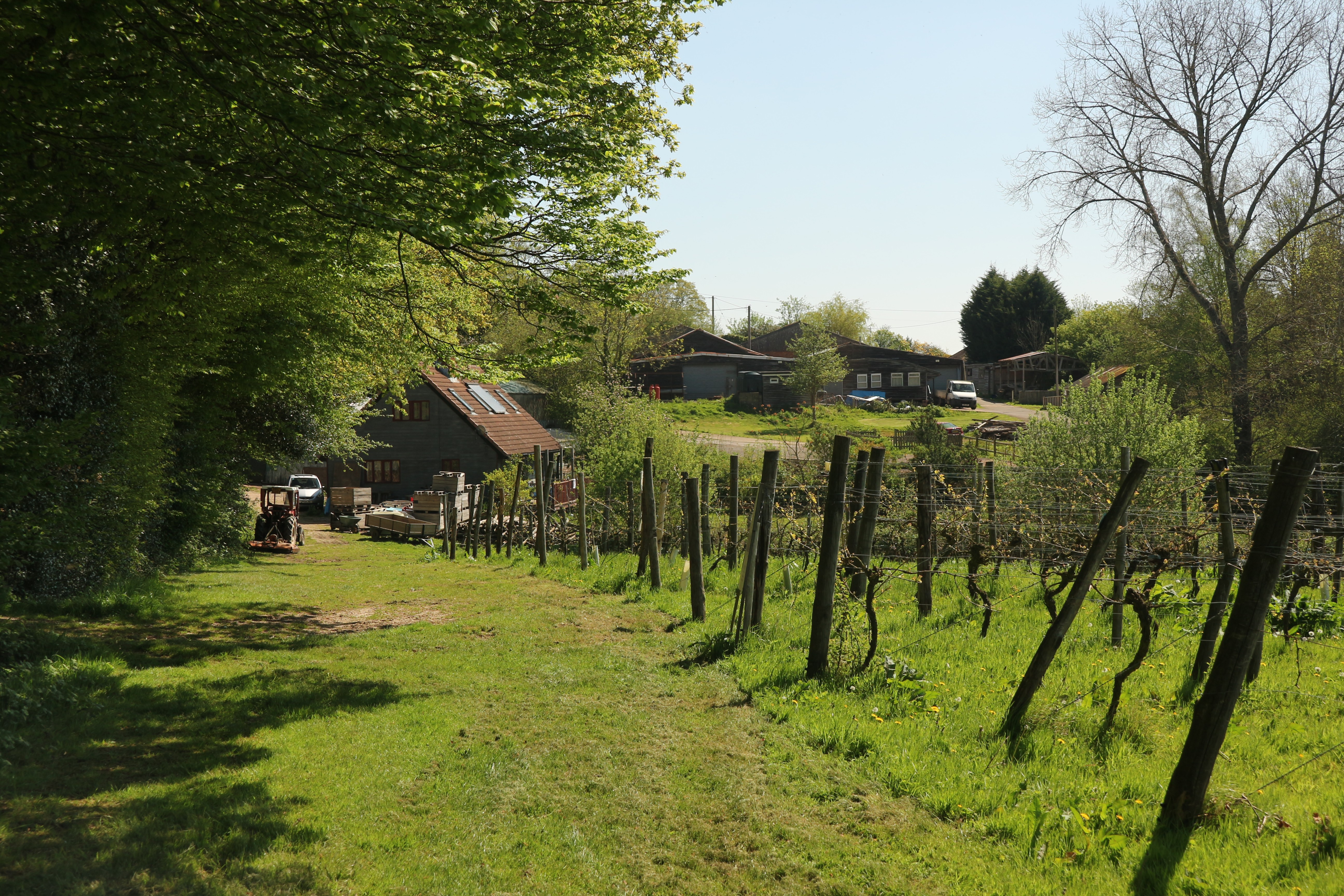
Sedlescombe Organic Vineyard

Sedlescombe Organic Vineyard is an English vineyard located in Robertsbridge, just outside Sedlescombe in East Sussex.

It is one of the few British vineyards to produce red wine, an all-organic vineyard established in 1979.
