= Frederick Hyland =

English first-class cricketer (1893 - 1964)

Personal information
- Full name: Frederick James Hyland
- Born: 16 December 1893; Sedlescombe, Sussex, England
- Died: 27 February 1964 (aged 70); Hartford, Cheshire, England
- Batting: Right-handed
- Bowling: Right-arm medium-fast

Domestic team information
- Years: Team
- 1924: Hampshire

Career statistics
Competition	First-class
Matches	1
Runs scored	0
Batting average	–
100s/50s	–/–
Top score	–
Catches/stumpings	–/–
- Source: Cricinfo, 19 January 2023

Frederick James Hyland (16 December 1893 — 27 February 1964) was an English first-class cricketer known for having the shortest first-class career ever, lasting just 12 balls.

== Life and cricket ==
The seventh child of George and Frances Annie Hyland, he was born in December 1893 at Sedlescombe, Sussex. As a child, his family moved regularly around England as his father, an agricultural labourer, sought jobs at different estates. In 1917, he married Ada Flucke at Holy Trinity Church, East Finchley. Around this time, he was resident at Addlestone in Surrey, where he was employed as a gardener. By 1921, he had moved south to Ringwood. There he was in business with his brother-in-law as a florist, fruiterer and gardener, with their business partnership being dissolved in October 1923.

In Ringwood, Hyland played club cricket for Ringwood Cricket Club as a bowler. Following a strong season in 1923, coupled with gaining of his Hampshire residential qualification, Hyland came to the attention of Hampshire County Cricket Club and was invited to play in a trial match at the start of the 1924 season, in which it is recorded 'he did quite well'. A month later, with Ronnie Aird, Alex Bowell and Geoffrey Lowndes unavailable for their County Championship match against Northamptonshire at Northampton, he was selected by Lionel Tennyson to play in the match as a fast bowler. Only two overs were bowled across the three days of the match due to rain, therefore Hyland was not able to bat or bowl; his is the shortest first-class career of all time, by some 47 balls. Hyland travelled with the Hampshire team to their next fixture which followed immediately after at Trent Bridge against Nottinghamshire, but with batsman Aird becoming available for selection once again, he was replaced in the Hampshire squad and did not play for the county again.

Following the 1924 season, he moved on from Hampshire to Norfolk, where he appeared as a substitute fielder for Norfolk in a Minor Counties Championship match in 1926. He later settled in Cheshire, where he became a nurseryman of some repute. In Cheshire he played club cricket for Winnington Park and was groundsman for Imperial Chemical Industries cricket ground at their Winnington Works, in addition to looking after two other grounds in the area. From 1945 to 1959, he ran a pet store in Northwich High Street, which he transferred to his son in 1960.

Hyland died in Cheshire at Hartford in February 1964, with his cause of death being recorded as mitral stenosis. He was survived by wife, their daughter and two sons.
