= Listed buildings in Stone-cum-Ebony =

Civil Parish in Kent, England

Stone-cum-Ebony is a village and civil parish in the Borough of Ashford of Kent, England. It contains one grade II* and 35 grade II listed buildings that are recorded in the National Heritage List for England.

This list is based on the information retrieved online from Historic England.

== Key ==
Grade	Criteria
I	Buildings that are of exceptional interest
II*	Particularly important buildings of more than special interest
II	Buildings that are of special interest

== Listing ==
Name	Grade	Location	Type	Completed (Note: The date given is the date used by Historic England as significant for the initial building or that of an important part in the structure's description.)	Date designated	Grid ref. (Note: The grid reference is based on the British national grid reference system, sometimes known as OSGB36, used by the Ordnance Survey.) Geo-coordinates	Notes	Entry number (Note: The "List Entry Number" is a unique number assigned to each listed building and scheduled monument by Historic England.)	Image	Wikidata
Cottage and Former Outbuilding to the Ferry Inn	II				1 August 1968	TQ9422228843; 51°01′34″N 0°46′06″E		1070867	Upload Photo	Q26325418
Ferry Cottage Myrtle Cottage the Ferry Inn	II				1 August 1968	TQ9421028822; 51°01′33″N 0°46′05″E		1362960	Upload Photo	Q26644819
Hayes Cottage	II				9 August 1979	TQ9136729703; 51°02′05″N 0°43′41″E		1070872	Upload Photo	Q26325432
Parish Church of St Mary the Virgin	II*				16 August 1962	TQ9401927347; 51°00′46″N 0°45′52″E		1362959	Parish Church of St Mary the Virgin More images	Q17556942
Rose Hill Cottage	II				9 August 1979	TQ9162628064; 51°01′12″N 0°43′51″E		1362961	Upload Photo	Q26644820
Tilmenden	II				4 June 1952	TQ9398327316; 51°00′45″N 0°45′50″E		1070866	Upload Photo	Q26325417
Upper Stonehouse	II				9 August 1979	TQ9187028381; 51°01′22″N 0°44′04″E		1070868	Upload Photo	Q26325422
Priory Farmhouse	II	Appledore Road			9 August 1979	TQ9412928221; 51°01′14″N 0°46′00″E		1070869	Upload Photo	Q26325424
The Baptist Chapel and Chapel Cottage	II	Appledore Road			9 August 1979	TQ9406428219; 51°01′14″N 0°45′56″E		1326642	Upload Photo	Q26612115
Catt's Farmhouse	II	Catt's Hill			9 August 1979	TQ9350327457; 51°00′50″N 0°45′26″E		1362962	Upload Photo	Q26644821
Rysings	II	Church Hill			9 August 1979	TQ9408327519; 51°00′51″N 0°45′56″E		1105645	Upload Photo	Q26399580
Hayes Farmhouse	II	Corkscrew Lane			9 August 1979	TQ9123729503; 51°01′59″N 0°43′34″E		1106224	Upload Photo	Q26400107
High House	II	Corkscrew Lane			9 August 1979	TQ9140229724; 51°02′06″N 0°43′43″E		1106228	Upload Photo	Q26400111
Leyton Cottages	II	1 and 2, Corkscrew Lane			9 August 1979	TQ9148429680; 51°02′04″N 0°43′47″E		1070871	Upload Photo	Q26325429
Ramsden Farmhouse	II	Corkscrew Lane			9 August 1979	TQ9122829423; 51°01′56″N 0°43′33″E		1070870	Upload Photo	Q26325427
Garage to South East of Knock House	II	Knock Road			9 August 1979	TQ9450026519; 51°00′19″N 0°46′15″E		1070875	Upload Photo	Q26325439
Huggit's Farmhouse	II	Knock Road			9 August 1979	TQ9391727245; 51°00′43″N 0°45′47″E		1070873	Upload Photo	Q26325434
Huggitt Cottage	II	Knock Road			9 August 1979	TQ9420726756; 51°00′27″N 0°46′01″E		1070874	Upload Photo	Q26325436
Knock House	II	Knock Road			9 August 1979	TQ9448626534; 51°00′19″N 0°46′15″E		1106242	Upload Photo	Q26400122
Tyhe	II	Knock Road			16 August 1962	TQ9378626846; 51°00′30″N 0°45′39″E		1106233	Upload Photo	Q26400115
Luckhurst Farmhouse	II	Lower Road			16 August 1962	TQ9351928344; 51°01′19″N 0°45′29″E		1070877	Upload Photo	Q26325443
Oasthouse at Odiam Farmhouse	II	Lower Road			9 August 1979	TQ9240028392; 51°01′22″N 0°44′31″E		1070879	Upload Photo	Q26325448
Oat Barn	II	Lower Road			9 August 1979	TQ9397628428; 51°01′21″N 0°45′52″E		1106382	Upload Photo	Q26400251
Odiam Farmhouse	II	Lower Road			9 August 1979	TQ9254928311; 51°01′19″N 0°44′39″E		1070878	Upload Photo	Q26325446
Stone Farmhouse	II	Lower Road			9 August 1979	TQ9303928194; 51°01′15″N 0°45′04″E		1106391	Upload Photo	Q26400256
Stone House	II	Lower Road			16 August 1962	TQ9214628543; 51°01′27″N 0°44′19″E		1325933	Upload Photo	Q26611451
Churchlands	II	The Street			9 August 1979	TQ9401727629; 51°00′55″N 0°45′53″E		1106355	Upload Photo	Q26400224
Craigerne	II	The Street			9 August 1979	TQ9399127751; 51°00′59″N 0°45′52″E		1070880	Upload Photo	Q26325450
Drury's House	II	The Street			9 August 1979	TQ9398527783; 51°01′00″N 0°45′51″E		1325957	Upload Photo	Q26611471
Post Office	II	The Street			9 August 1979	TQ9397727820; 51°01′01″N 0°45′51″E		1362926	Upload Photo	Q26644787
Stone Green Farmhouse	II	The Street			9 August 1979	TQ9398927669; 51°00′56″N 0°45′51″E		1362925	Upload Photo	Q26644786
The Cottage the Forge	II	The Street			16 August 1962	TQ9397727840; 51°01′02″N 0°45′51″E		1325959	Upload Photo	Q26611473
Timber Cottage	II	The Street, Stone-in-oxney, Tenterden, TN30 7JN			9 August 1979	TQ9399227725; 51°00′58″N 0°45′52″E		1325927	Upload Photo	Q26611446
Oak Farmhouse	II	Top Road			9 August 1979	TQ9343927162; 51°00′41″N 0°45′22″E		1070876	Upload Photo	Q26325441
Prawls	II	Wittersham Road			16 August 1962	TQ9287126757; 51°00′28″N 0°44′52″E		1362927	Upload Photo	Q26644788
Wattle Corner	II	Wittersham Road			9 August 1979	TQ9295227314; 51°00′46″N 0°44′58″E		1070881	Upload Photo	Q26325453

== See also ==
- Grade I listed buildings in Kent
- Grade II* listed buildings in Kent

== Sources ==
- Newman, John (2012) [1969], Kent: West and the Weald, The Buildings of England, New Haven and London: Yale University Press, ISBN 978-0-300-18509-6
