= Listed buildings in Wittersham =

Civil Parish in Kent, England

Wittersham is a village and civil parish in the Borough of Ashford of Kent, England. It contains one grade I, one grade II* and 51 grade II listed buildings that are recorded in the National Heritage List for England.

This list is based on the information retrieved online from Historic England.

== Key ==
Grade	Criteria
I	Buildings that are of exceptional interest
II*	Particularly important buildings of more than special interest
II	Buildings that are of special interest

== Listing ==
Name	Grade	Location	Type	Completed (Note: The date given is the date used by Historic England as significant for the initial building or that of an important part in the structure's description.)	Date designated	Grid ref. (Note: The grid reference is based on the British national grid reference system, sometimes known as OSGB36, used by the Ordnance Survey.) Geo-coordinates	Notes	Entry number (Note: The "List Entry Number" is a unique number assigned to each listed building and scheduled monument by Historic England.)	Image	Wikidata
Wittersham War Memorial	II				14 November 2014	TQ9006027312; 51°00′50″N 0°42′29″E		1422309	Wittersham War Memorial More images	Q26676940
Acton Manor	II	Acton Lane			9 August 1979	TQ9068227992; 51°01′11″N 0°43′02″E		1106326	Upload Photo	Q26400198
Owley	II	Acton Lane			16 August 1962	TQ9020828509; 51°01′28″N 0°42′39″E		1070882	Upload Photo	Q26325456
Budd's Farmhouse	II	Budd's Lane			16 August 1962	TQ9020426555; 51°00′25″N 0°42′35″E		1325952	Upload Photo	Q26611469
Hurst Farm Cottage	II	Budd's Lane			9 August 1979	TQ9068627139; 51°00′43″N 0°43′01″E		1325980	Upload Photo	Q26611490
Oasthouse at Budd's Farm Situated to North of Farmhouse	II	Budds Lane			9 August 1979	TQ9019826613; 51°00′27″N 0°42′35″E		1070883	Upload Photo	Q26325458
Barn at Rugden	II	Moons Green Road			9 August 1979	TQ8843327916; 51°01′11″N 0°41′07″E		1070885	Upload Photo	Q26325463
Blackbrook Farmhouse	II	Moons Green Road			16 August 1962	TQ8838426722; 51°00′33″N 0°41′02″E		1325974	Upload Photo	Q26611485
Hunts Hill	II	Moons Green Road			9 August 1979	TQ8858127235; 51°00′49″N 0°41′13″E		1362928	Upload Photo	Q26644789
Moat Farmhouse	II	Moons Green Road			9 August 1979	TQ8835027429; 51°00′55″N 0°41′02″E		1106283	Upload Photo	Q26400160
Rugden	II	Moons Green Road			9 August 1979	TQ8842427896; 51°01′10″N 0°41′07″E		1362929	Upload Photo	Q26644790
Yewtree Farmhouse	II	Moons Green Road			9 August 1979	TQ8856227724; 51°01′05″N 0°41′13″E		1070884	Upload Photo	Q26325460
Peening Farmhouse	II	Peening Quarter			16 August 1962	TQ8865128738; 51°01′37″N 0°41′20″E		1070843	Upload Photo	Q26325361
The Lordings	II	Peening Quarter			16 August 1962	TQ8874028716; 51°01′37″N 0°41′24″E		1070842	Upload Photo	Q26325358
The Quarter House	II	Peening Quarter			16 August 1962	TQ8868028689; 51°01′36″N 0°41′21″E		1362948	Upload Photo	Q26644809
3, 5 and 7, Poplar Road	II	3, 5 and 7, Poplar Road			9 August 1979	TQ8993727392; 51°00′52″N 0°42′23″E		1362949	Upload Photo	Q26644810
Corner Cottage the White Cottage	II	26, Poplar Road			9 August 1979	TQ8980427624; 51°01′00″N 0°42′17″E		1362950	Upload Photo	Q26644811
Poplar	II	Poplar Road			16 August 1962	TQ8990327506; 51°00′56″N 0°42′22″E		1070845	Upload Photo	Q26325365
The Corner Stores	II	6, Poplar Road			9 August 1979	TQ9004727351; 51°00′51″N 0°42′29″E		1070844	Upload Photo	Q26325364
Cuckoo Cottage	II	Rolvenden Road			9 August 1979	TQ8844828342; 51°01′25″N 0°41′09″E		1323134	Upload Photo	Q26608886
Cullens	II	Rolvenden Road, Potman's Heath			9 August 1979	TQ8736428013; 51°01′15″N 0°40′12″E		1362951	Upload Photo	Q26644812
Oasthouse at Palstre Court	II	Rolvenden Road			9 August 1979	TQ8829028423; 51°01′28″N 0°41′01″E		1070848	Upload Photo	Q26325372
Palstre Court	II	Rolvenden Road			9 August 1979	TQ8829228380; 51°01′26″N 0°41′01″E		1070847	Upload Photo	Q26325370
Potman's Heath House	II	Rolvenden Road, Potman's Heath			9 August 1979	TQ8743728020; 51°01′16″N 0°40′16″E		1070846	Upload Photo	Q26325368
Prospect	II	Rye Road			16 August 1962	TQ9134227038; 51°00′39″N 0°43′34″E		1120883	Upload Photo	Q26414084
Stocks Farmhouse	II	Rye Road			16 August 1962	TQ9144927288; 51°00′47″N 0°43′40″E		1362952	Upload Photo	Q26644813
Tophill Farmhouse	II	Rye Road			9 August 1979	TQ9120126793; 51°00′31″N 0°43′27″E		1070849	Upload Photo	Q26325375
Underhill Farmhouse	II	Rye Road			16 August 1962	TQ9137926496; 51°00′22″N 0°43′35″E		1120891	Upload Photo	Q26414091
Mill House	II	Stocks Road			9 August 1979	TQ9020627247; 51°00′47″N 0°42′37″E		1120894	Upload Photo	Q26414094
The Ewe and Lamb Inn	II	Stocks Road			9 August 1979	TQ9008527347; 51°00′51″N 0°42′31″E		1070850	The Ewe and Lamb Inn More images	Q26325378
The Stocks	II	Stocks Road			4 June 1952	TQ9126327315; 51°00′48″N 0°43′31″E		1070851	Upload Photo	Q26325381
The Stocks Windmill	II*	Stocks Road			4 June 1952	TQ9130427305; 51°00′48″N 0°43′33″E		1323124	The Stocks Windmill More images	Q7618188
20, Swan Street	II	20, Swan Street			9 August 1979	TQ8942327398; 51°00′53″N 0°41′57″E		1362955	Upload Photo	Q26644816
21, Swan Street	II	21, Swan Street			9 August 1979	TQ8955527430; 51°00′54″N 0°42′04″E		1070858	Upload Photo	Q26325395
29, Swan Street	II	29, Swan Street			27 November 2003	TQ8945327384; 51°00′53″N 0°41′58″E		1390793	Upload Photo	Q26670171
Finches	II	Swan Street			9 August 1979	TQ8919827358; 51°00′52″N 0°41′45″E		1120816	Upload Photo	Q26414023
Island Cottage	II	18, Swan Street			9 August 1979	TQ8951827450; 51°00′55″N 0°42′02″E		1323180	Upload Photo	Q26608929
The Hall	II	Swan Street			9 August 1979	TQ8888527249; 51°00′49″N 0°41′29″E		1070859	Upload Photo	Q26325398
The Hamel	II	7, Swan Street			9 August 1979	TQ8966427492; 51°00′56″N 0°42′09″E		1120808	Upload Photo	Q26414016
Wittersham Manor	II	Swan Street			9 August 1979	TQ8895926963; 51°00′40″N 0°41′32″E		1323166	Upload Photo	Q26608917
29, the Street	II	29, The Street			9 August 1979	TQ8978227016; 51°00′40″N 0°42′14″E		1070854	Upload Photo	Q26325385
33, the Street	II	33, The Street			9 August 1979	TQ8976127009; 51°00′40″N 0°42′13″E		1120844	Upload Photo	Q26414050
39, the Street	II	39, The Street			16 August 1962	TQ8971526955; 51°00′38″N 0°42′11″E		1070855	Upload Photo	Q26325388
8 and 8a, the Street	II	8 and 8a, The Street			9 August 1979	TQ8992727146; 51°00′44″N 0°42′22″E		1070856	Upload Photo	Q26325391
Furners	II	53, The Street			9 August 1979	TQ8963926846; 51°00′35″N 0°42′07″E		1362953	Upload Photo	Q26644814
Martens	II	7, The Street			9 August 1979	TQ9006527239; 51°00′47″N 0°42′29″E		1070853	Upload Photo	Q26325382
No. 30, the Street	II	30, The Street, TN30 7ED			16 August 1962	TQ8968526964; 51°00′39″N 0°42′09″E		1070857	Upload Photo	Q26325393
Old Queens	II	43, The Street			9 August 1979	TQ8970026940; 51°00′38″N 0°42′10″E		1120822	Upload Photo	Q26414028
Oxney House	II	32, The Street			9 August 1979	TQ8967026945; 51°00′38″N 0°42′09″E		1362954	Upload Photo	Q26644815
Parish Church of St John the Baptist	I	The Street			16 August 1962	TQ8975026965; 51°00′39″N 0°42′13″E		1070852	Parish Church of St John the Baptist More images	Q17529238
The Homestead	II	2, The Street			9 August 1979	TQ9001327279; 51°00′49″N 0°42′27″E		1323146	Upload Photo	Q26608897
Wittersham Court	II	The Street			16 August 1962	TQ8984127019; 51°00′40″N 0°42′18″E		1120839	Upload Photo	Q26414045
Wittersham House	II	28, The Street			16 August 1962	TQ8975827086; 51°00′43″N 0°42′13″E		1120832	Upload Photo	Q26414038

== See also ==
- Grade I listed buildings in Kent
- Grade II* listed buildings in Kent

== Sources ==
- Newman, John (2012) [1969], Kent: West and the Weald, The Buildings of England, New Haven and London: Yale University Press, ISBN 978-0-300-18509-6
