= Sedlescombe =

Village and parish in East Sussex, England

Coordinates: 50.93°N 0.53°E

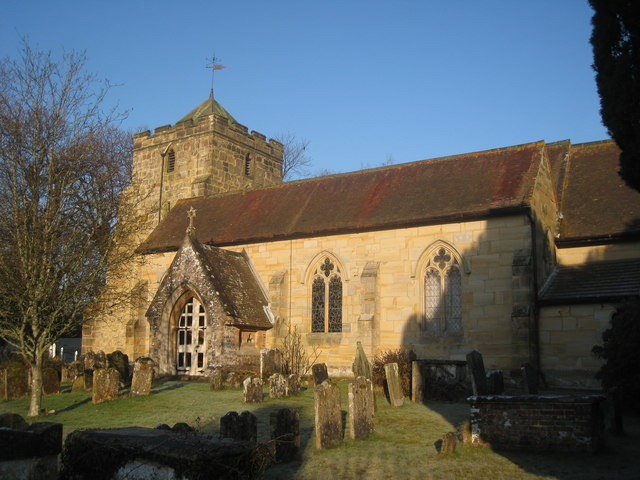
- St John the Baptist parish church

- Location within East Sussex
- Area: 12.6 km^{2} (4.9 sq mi)
- Population: 1,476 (2011 Census)
  - Density: 273/sq mi (105/km^{2})
- OS grid reference: TQ781180
  - London: 48 mi (77 km) NW
- Civil parish: Sedlescombe
- District: Rother
- Shire county: East Sussex
- Region: South East
- Country: England
- Sovereign state: United Kingdom
- Post town: Battle
- Postcode district: TN33
- Dialling code: 01424
- Police: Sussex
- Fire: East Sussex
- Ambulance: South East Coast
- UK Parliament: Bexhill and Battle
- Website: Sedlescombe Parish Council

Sedlescombe is a village and civil parish in the Rother district of East Sussex, England. The village is on the B2244 road, about 6 miles (10 km) north of Hastings. The parish includes the hamlet of Kent Street, which is on the A21 road.

The parish is in the High Weald Area of Outstanding Natural Beauty. The River Brede and its tributary, the River Line, flow through it; Powdermill Reservoir is on its eastern boundary. The 2011 Census recorded the parish's population as 1,476.

== Manor ==
In the reign of Edward the Confessor (1042–66) Countess Godgifu was overlord of the manor of Sedlescombe. Her Lord of the manor was a Saxon called Leofsi, who also held a manor at Marden in what is now West Sussex. The Domesday Book of 1086 records that, by that date, the Norman nobleman Robert, Count of Eu held the manor of Sedlescombe. His tenant-in-chief was one Walter, son of Lambert, who also held manors at Crowhurst, Hazelhurst and Ripe. The village name seems to derive from Old English 'setl' meaning a seat or residence, and 'comb' meaning valley or low place.

== Notable buildings ==
=== Manor houses ===
Manor Cottages in The Street is a 15th-century timber-framed building with a 16th-century extension. It was built as a single manor house but was later divided into five cottages. It was a Grade I listed building.

Durhamford Manor in Stream Lane is an early 16th-century timber-framed house. It is a Grade II* listed building.

=== Churches ===
St John's parish is now part of the Benefice of Sedlescombe with Whatlington. The Church of England parish church of St John the Baptist has a 15th-century Perpendicular Gothic nave, north aisle and west tower. The present chancel, south aisle and south porch were added in 1866–74 as part of a restoration by Norman and Billing. The chancel's north and south windows have stained glass made by CE Kempe in 1890. The building is Grade II* listed.

The west tower has a ring of six bells. Robert Mot of Houndsditch and Whitechapel cast the tenor bell in 1592. Joseph Carter of Whitechapel cast the fifth bell in 1606 and the second, third and fourth bells in 1607. Mears & Stainbank of the Whitechapel Bell Foundry cast the treble bell in 1929.

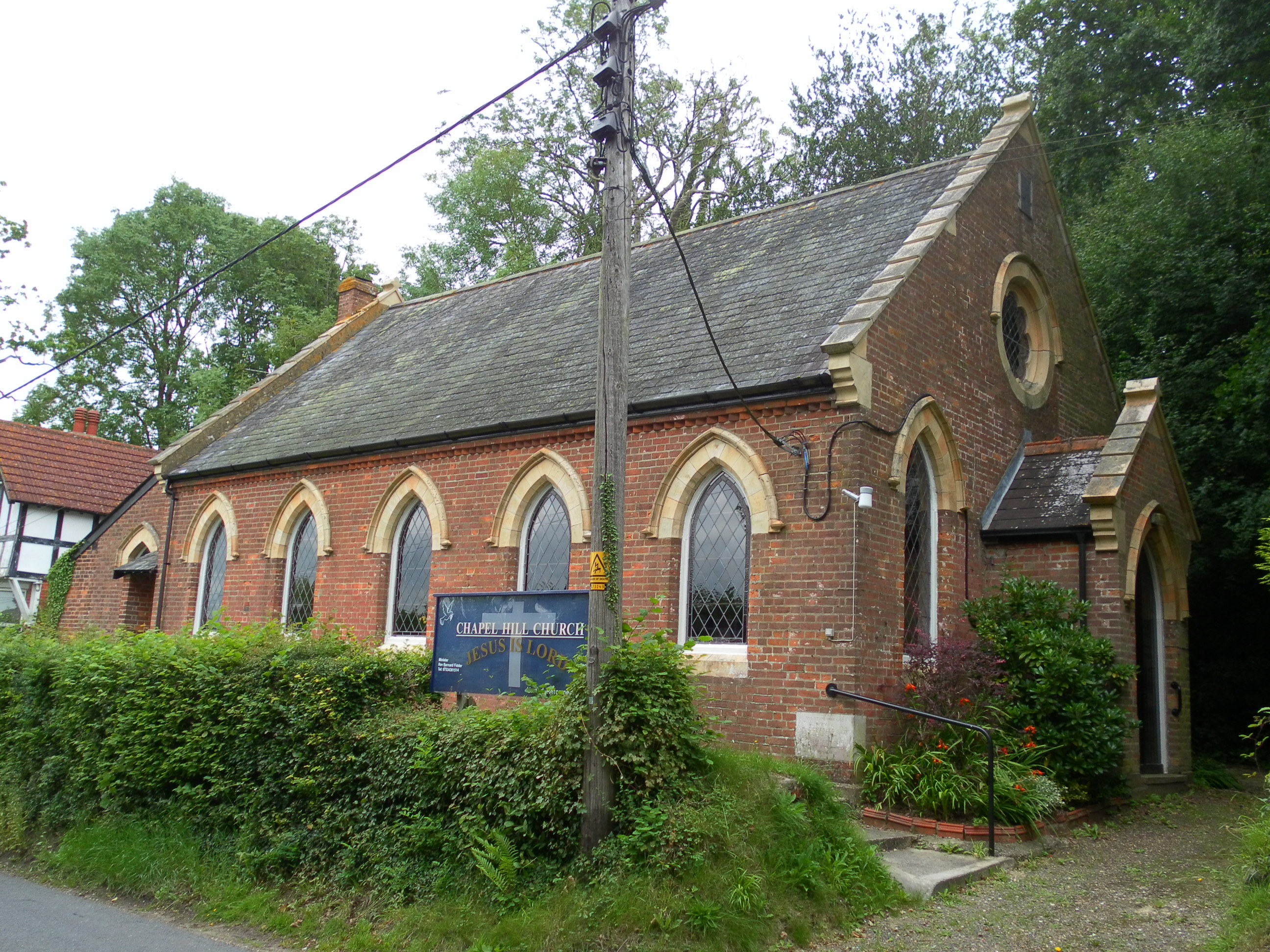
United Reformed Church

There is also a United Reformed Church.

=== Other ===
Asselton House in The Street is a 15th-century timber-framed house. Its northwest wing was added in the 19th century.

Pestalozzi International Village, named after the Swiss philanthropist Johann Heinrich Pestalozzi, is an educational charity founded in 1946. In 1959 it moved to Oaklands, a Tudor Revival house in Sedlescombe. A Warden's House and International House were designed for it by Hugh Casson and Neville Conder.

== Amenities ==
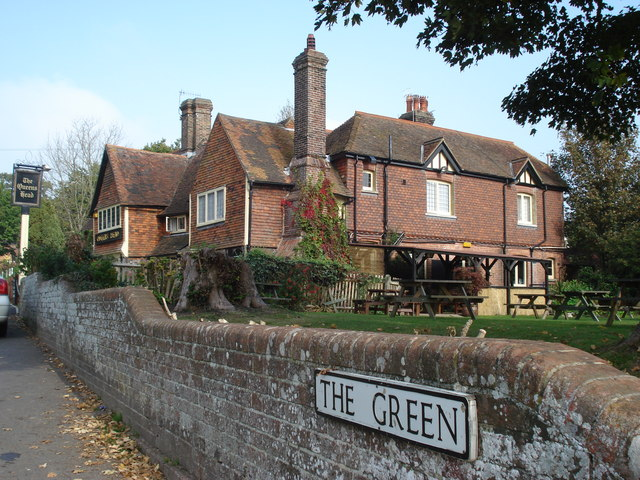
The Queen's Head

Sedlescombe has a 15th-century pub, the Queen's Head Inn, that is now a gastropub. There is also a hotel and a bed and breakfast.

The village has a post office and general store and a Church of England primary school.

Just outside the village is Sedlescombe Golf Club, which hosts the James Andrews School of Golf.

== Notable people ==
- Frederick Hyland (1893–1964), first-class cricketer
- Hetti Bywater, English former actress

== See also ==
- Sedlescombe vineyard

== Sources and further reading ==
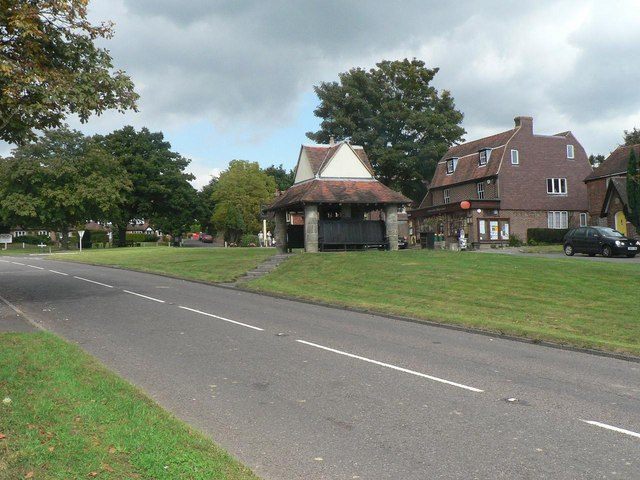
The Green, with Sedlescombe Post Office and Stores on the right

- Lewis, Samuel, ed. (1931) [1848]. A Topographical Dictionary of England (Seventh ed.). London: Samuel Lewis. pp. 44–48.
- Lucey, Beryl (1984). A Village Where The World is One: The Story of the International Children's Village in England. London: Regency Press.
- Lucey, Beryl (1999). Twenty Centuries in Sedlescombe: An East Sussex Parish. Sedlescombe: Asselton Books. ISBN 978-0953469505.
- Nairn, Ian; Pevsner, Nikolaus (1965). Sussex. The Buildings of England. Harmondsworth: Penguin Books. p. 604. ISBN 0-14-071028-0.
