= Powdermill Reservoir =

Lake in East Sussex, England

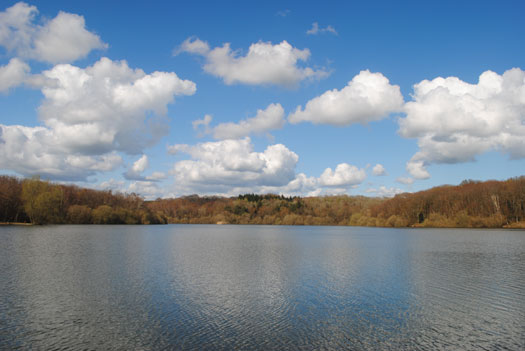
- Powdermill Reservoir, East Sussex, April 2012

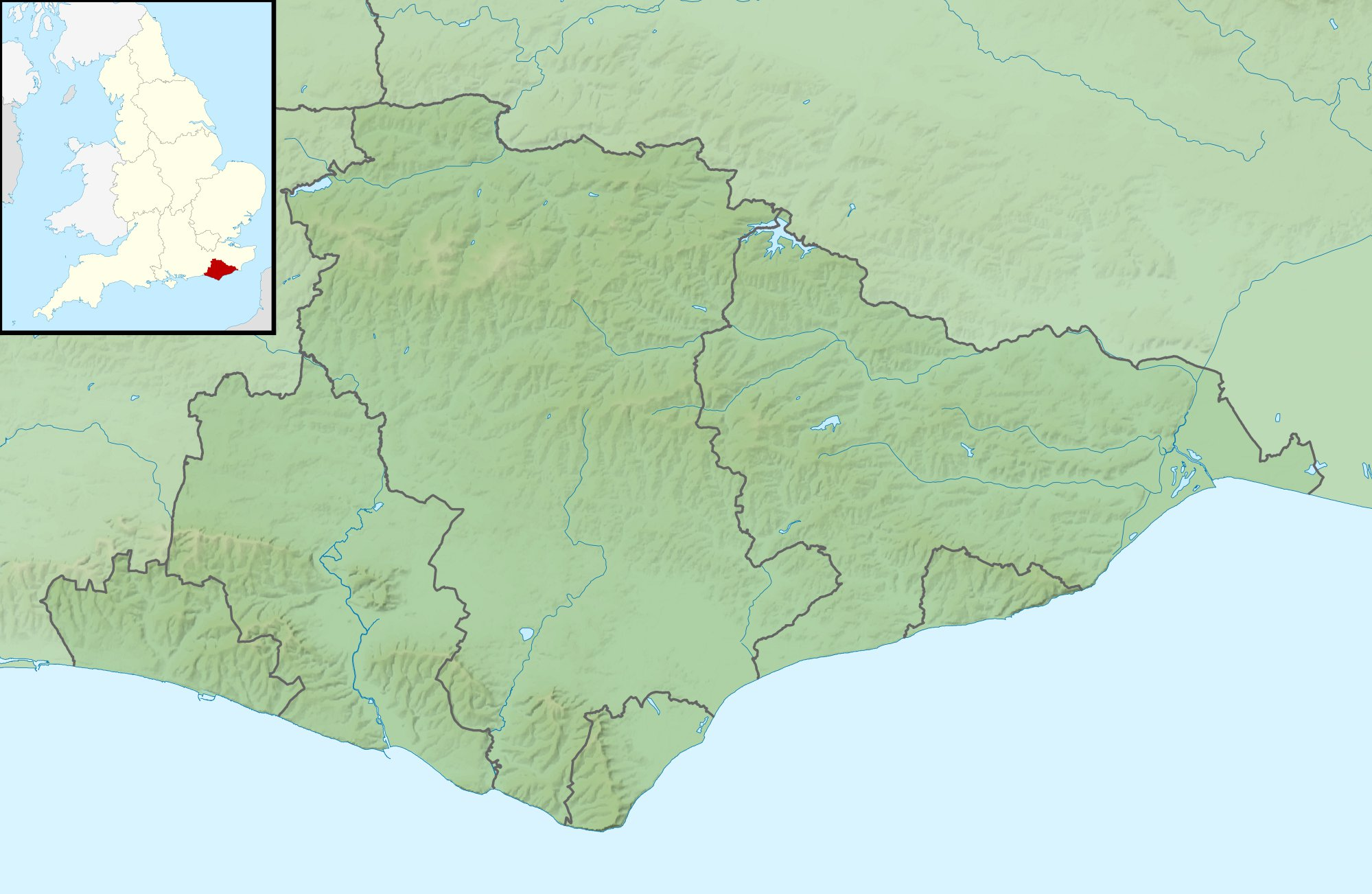
- Powdermill Reservoir shown within East Sussex
- Location: Sedlescombe, East Sussex
- Coordinates: 50.948°N 0.562°E
- Type: reservoir
- Basin countries: United Kingdom
- Water volume: 1,060 megalitres (860 acre⋅ft)

Powdermill Reservoir lies to the east of Sedlescombe, East Sussex, England. The reservoir provides water for Southern Water customers.

== History ==
Originally forming part of the Great Sanders Estate, the name is derived from the fact that there was an 18th-century black powder (gunpowder) manufacturer on the site. The mill used to grind the powder was driven by water from a mill pond formed by a dam across the original stream. The mill was the scene of three explosions, before its eventual closure, in which several workers died (one of whom, according to a rather ghoulish contemporary newspaper report, was blown into five, named, pieces). One of the original pair of mill stones may be seen, half buried, at the eastern end of the dam. Prior to its use as a powdermill the site held an iron foundry which pre dated the attempt by the Spanish Armada to invade Britain.

Under the direction of Sydney Little, "The Concrete King", the reservoir was constructed between 1929 and 1932.

The dam is of earth with a concrete slab facing and a puddle clay core and is 370 yards (340 m) long with a height of 40 feet (12 m). The construction of the dam required 170 men working for nearly 40 months and, due to unforeseen difficulties caused by underlying and extruding sandstone strata, the estimated construction costs were exceeded by a considerable margin. A number of the workers employed on the site were of Welsh origin and several married local girls and settled in the area giving rise to a fair proportion of Welsh surnames in the Sedlescombe community.

Filling of the reservoir began on 5 November 1931 and was complete in March 1932.

== Fishing ==
Once the reservoir was completed in March 1932, the Hastings Corporation (the original owners) were approached for the lease of the fishing rights. A seven-year lease was granted to the Hastings Fly Fisher's Club for a fee of £5 per annum and with the undertaking to stock the waters with two thousand fish per season. Since then the lease and the number of fish stocked has risen by a considerable margin.
