= River Brede =

River in East Sussex, England

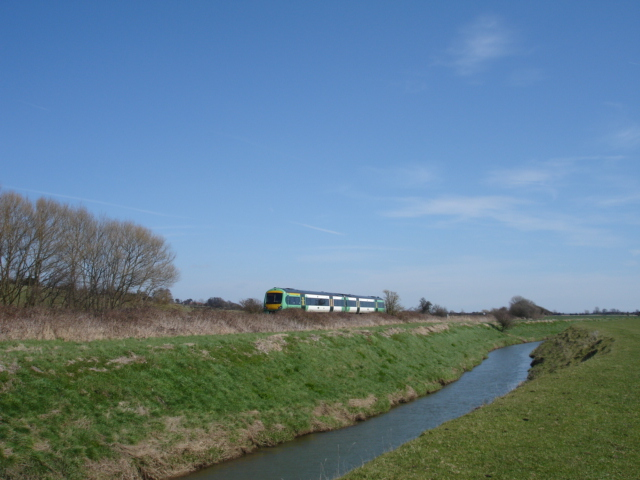
- The river to the west of Winchelsea

Location
- Country: England

Physical characteristics
- Source
  - location: Netherfield, west of Battle, East Sussex
  - elevation: 360 feet (110 m)
- Mouth
  - location: River Rother, Rye
  - elevation: sea level

The River Brede is an English river in East Sussex. It flows into the Rock Channel (tidal section of the River Tillingham) and then onto the River Rother at Rye, Sussex. It takes its name from the village of Brede, which lies between Hastings and Tenterden.

== Etymology ==
The river takes its name from the village of Brede. The village is on the north bank of the river, and its name in Old English means breadth, as it overlooks the wide river valley. Prior to the fifteenth century, the river was known as the Ee or Ree, which simply means 'river' in Old English. A new channel was then constructed for much of its course downstream from its junction with Doleham Ditch, slightly to the north of the Ee, and running parallel with it, which was for many years known as the Channel, but subsequently became the Brede.

== History ==
The Brede flows through a wide valley in its lower reaches, surrounded by marshland which is at much the same level as the river. After passing close to the higher ground on which New Winchelsea was later built, it turns to the north, passing through an area known historically as Cadborough Marsh, which contained a network of tidal channels in the 13th century. During the 12th century, large areas of marsh were enclosed, beginning at the edge of Cadborough Cliff, and working southwards towards the river. Similar work was taking place further east at Broomhill, near to the seaward end of Jury's Gut Sewer, and it is likely that the marshes were protected from the sea by a large shingle bank that ran westwards from Broomhill to Fairlight. Many of the people involved in the enclosures were doing so at both locations, and the work seems to have been influenced by Flemish immigrants. There is little documentary evidence for reclaiming of marshland further upstream, although it clearly took place in the 12th or early 13th centuries.

Climatic conditions deteriorated in the 13th century, with many more storms occurring. At some point, the shingle bank was breached, and the River Rother carved a new course through the gap to enter the sea near Rye. The winter of 1287-88 was particularly bad, and the village of Old Winchelsea was overwhelmed, as was much of the reclaimed marshland near Cadborough Cliff, which remained flooded for 15 years. At some point around this time, the Brede valley was protected by the construction of a wall, some 1,100 yards (1,000 m) long known as the Damme, which crossed the valley from Icklesham in the south to the modern-day Float Farm in the north. It protected 1,036 acres (419 ha) to the west of it, and provided a convenient way to cross the valley, although tolls were collected for its use. There was a bridge in the centre and a sluice to control the flow of water, which was operated by pulleys. A dock was constructed on the eastern side, which was known as a flota, from which the name of Float Farm derives. Ships were loaded with firewood for onward transfer to London and Europe, while other timber products included a shipment of hurdles for Dover Castle.

A second embankment was constructed further downstream, running northwards from Winchelsea, but the effect of the sea walls was to reduce the volume of sea water that entered the valley with each tide, reducing its scouring action. As the consequence, the river silted up, and by 1357 it was difficult for ships to reach Winchelsea. The king visited the town, and instructed that walls should be built along the valley and that the obstruction at Sloughdam should be removed. It is unclear whether this referred to the embankment at Winchelsea of to the Damme further upstream. The solution adopted to resolve the silting was to construct a new channel for the river, with embankments on both sides. It was around 4.7 miles (7.6 km) long and 165 yards (150 m) wide, and was completed some time between 1419 and 1442. Its western end was just below the point at which Doleham Ditch joined the Ee. The dock at Damme ceased to be used, as the river then became navigable to Brede Bridge, where a new quay was constructed.

The Brede is known to have been used for navigation beyond Brede Bridge, with boats reaching Sedlescombe. Lead was carried for Battle Abbey, and in the Tudor period, an iron furnace was built at Brede, which continued to operate until 1766. Between 1747 and 1766, boats brought iron ore to the furnaces from Strand Wharf in Rye, and transported guns which had been manufactured from the iron back down the river. There was also a trade in groceries, moving up the river.

Access to the sea from Winchelsea and Rye was continually changing, as the whole area is subject to deposition of shingle and silt. Winchelsea once had a harbour, but by the 1550s, it had been abandoned as a port. The future of the port of Rye, a little further to the north, was in doubt by 1600, and Camber Castle, which had once protected the entrances to Winchelsea and Rye harbours was abandoned in the 1640s, as it could no longer serve that function, due to the changing channels. The idea of cutting a new channel was first suggested by the Italian engineer Frederico Genebelli in 1593, but was rejected by Rye Corporation, who thought it would enhance the port of Winchelsea, more than the port of Rye. Commissioners from the Royal Navy and Trinity House decided that Rye Harbour was of no further use in 1698.

However, the Dover Harbour Act 1722 (9 Geo. 1. c. 30) was obtained on 27 May 1723, which authorised a new cut to be made from the Brede near Winchelsea to the sea, as well as repairs to Dover Harbour. The plans are not clearly understood, for the records of the Rye Harbour Commissioners are often confused and garbled. The new channel would run from the right-angled bend where the present river turns northwards towards Rye, and run to the south, broadly following Sea Road and Dogs Hill Road, but a little further to the east. The Harbour Commissioners consulted the naval officer and civil engineer John Perry, who estimated that the project would cost £13,732, and a second act of Parliament, the Rye Harbour Act 1723 (10 Geo. 1. c. 7) was obtained on 19 March 1724. £4,000 was borrowed from the Bank of England, to allow the work to start, and one of the first tasks was the construction of a drawbridge over the existing Winchelsea Channel of the River Brede, so that access from Rye to the new works was possible. John Reynolds completed the bridge in 1725. Meanwhile, Perry had marked out the route, and the process of buying the land began.

The canal was to be 20 feet (6.1 m) deep at high water on spring tides, which would make it suitable for ships of 300 tons, with a draught of up to 16 feet (4.9 m). In the lower half there would be a scouring sluice and navigation gates. The canal would be 150 feet (46 m) wide above the sluice and 200 feet (61 m) wide below it. Work on the scouring sluice and the reservoir which would store the water for scouring of the channel was undertaken by Humphrey Smith in 1727 and 1728. Piers were to be constructed where the canal met the sea, and the west pier was the first to be started in 1728. Building of the foundations was overseen by Edward Rubie, Perry's foreman, and the contract for the main stonework was awarded to Christopher Cass and Andrews Jelfe. They completed the work in 1730. Perry then left the project, and Rubie went on to supervise the construction of the east pier and the grand sluice, although it is thought that his working drawings were based on Perry's original plans. The grand sluice was the largest of its kind at the time, having five gates, each of which was 6 feet (1.8 m) wide, and had huge abutments and a large central pier. Next to it was a navigation channel, which was 40 feet (12 m) wide, and had a pair of pointed gates. By 1733 some £20,000 had been spent on the project, and after a brief pause to raise some more money, work resumed under the supervision of Robert Cooper.

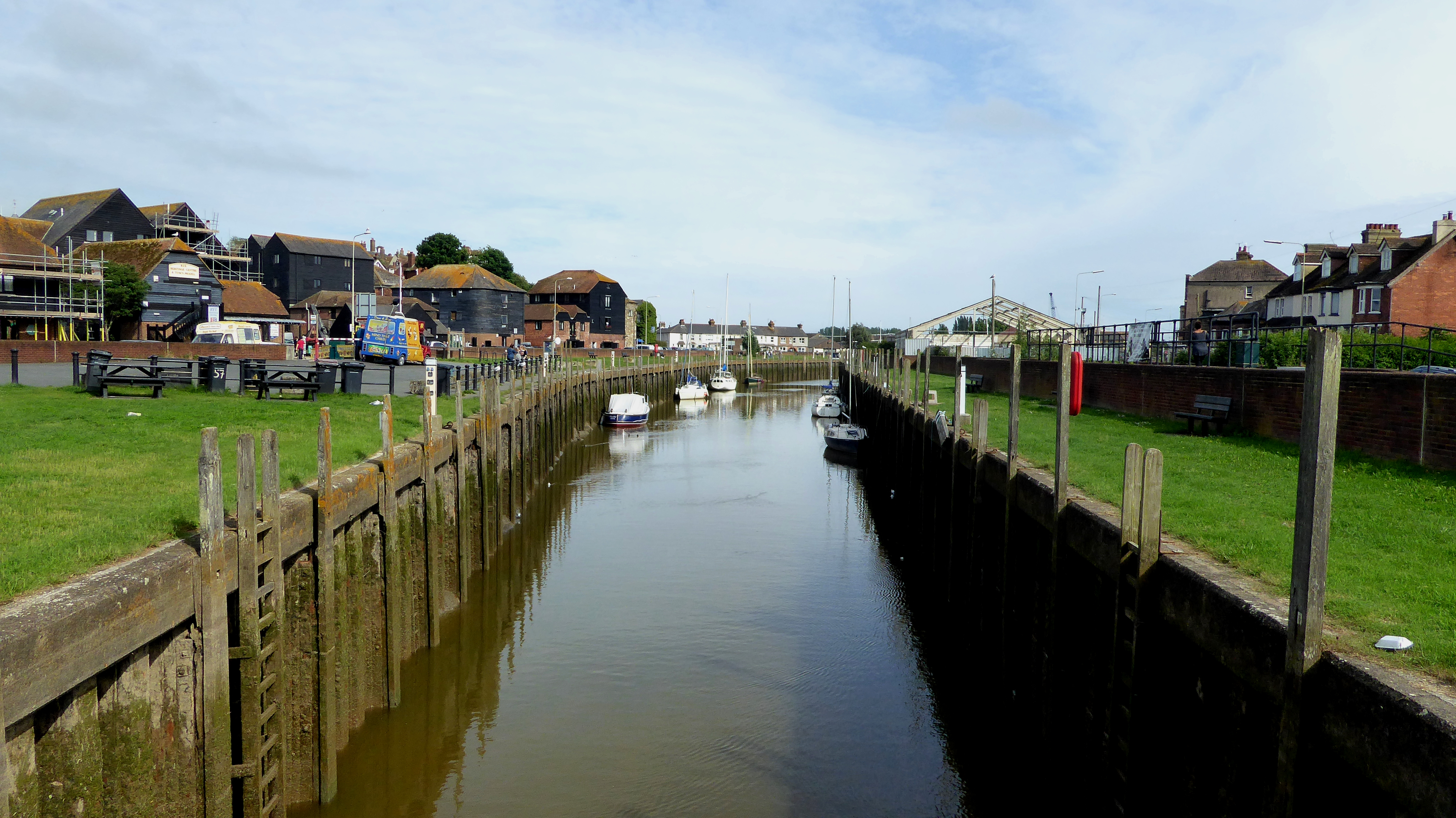
River Brede as it passes through Rye

The canal had initially only been excavated to a depth of 8 feet (2.4 m), and Cooper oversaw the deepening of the channel to 20 feet (6.1 m). Wharfs were built, and the canal had been excavated to its full depth for 275 yards (251 m) from the piers at its southern end by the time Rubie left the project in 1748. Cooper continued making the channel deeper, built a 200-foot (61 m) jetty on the end of the west pier, and finally removed the shingle bank which kept the water out of the workings. The project had cost £42,000 by this point. The Commissioners then attempted to obtain another act of Parliament, to authorise additional charges to shipping to cover the cost of the work. They succeeded on a second attempt with the Dover and Rye Harbour Act 1764 (4 Geo. 3. c. 72).

Meanwhile, the commissioners asked for advice from the civil engineer John Smeaton, who recommended that the Brede, the Tillingham and the Rother should all be diverted into the new channel. He suggested that a new course for the Rother should be cut to the north of Rye, but was never involved in the practical management of the scheme. A new channel was cut to the south of the town. The historian John Collard has suggested that this latter phase was marked by incompetence and failure at a managerial level. The commissioners ordered that the old channel was not to be used after 14 July 1787, with traffic passing up the new harbour to the Strand Wharf. It was not entirely successful, as the harbour mouth still suffered from shingle deposition and silting. A wet autumn in 1787 caused extensive flooding of the levels, and the Harbour Commissioners, many of whom were also commissioners for the various levels, resolved to abandon the new harbour on 6 November 1787, and the old route to the sea was re-opened. After 63 years work, the new harbour was only used for four months. The entrance lock to the Brede at Rye was built in the following year, and the merchants of Rye thanked the commissioners in April 1789 for restoring "the Ancient Harbour of Rye."

When the Napoleonic Wars with the French began in 1803, less than a year after the signing of the Treaty of Amiens, which had ended the previous war with France, there were fears that the French might invade England. Consequently, a number of Martello towers were built, and the Royal Military Canal was proposed. This became a project for a defensive canal from Hythe, Kent in the east to Cliff End, near Pett in East Sussex. Two sections were new, with the middle part of it consisting of the River Rother from Iden Lock to Rye, and the Brede from Rye to Winchelsea. By the time it was completed in 1809, the threat of invasion had passed.

The Commissioners of Sewers for the Levels of Brede and Pett were required, under powers granted by the Rye Harbour Act 1833 (3 & 4 Will. 4. c. lxvii), to ensure that Brede Sluice was navigable, and that barges could travel up the river as far as Brede Bridge. This was carried out, as there is evidence that barges operated on the river during the nineteenth century. In 1903, when the Brede Valley Waterworks was being built, materials were transported by barge to a wharf immediately upstream of Brede Bridge. They were unloaded by a steam crane, and transferred to an 18 in (457 mm) gauge tramway, operated by an 0-4-0 saddle tank and four waggons. Coal to power the triple-expansion steam engines continued to be delivered by water until around 1928. 20-ton barges could only reach Brede Bridge on 2 days every two weeks, when water levels were adequate. There was also a brickyard in the vicinity, which was served by a wharf on the south bank of the river below the bridge. There was an entrance lock just to the south of Rye, which had two sets of gates facing in both directions, so that it could be used at most states of the tide. It was suitable for boats which were 40 by 12 feet (12.2 by 3.7 m), drawing 3 feet (0.91 m). By the time of the Land Drainage Act 1930, the land drainage function of the rivers was more important, and from 1933, river levels were reduced. A regulation to abolish the right of navigation became effective in 1934, although boats continued to deliver fuel to the Brede Valley Waterworks until 1935, when a road was built from the village to the works. Navigation is still possible in the winter months, but during the summer, Udimore sluice is used to retain water in the upper river, preventing the use of boats on parts of the river.

The Brede is a main river from Seddlescombe to its mouth, and so is managed by the Environment Agency. Land drainage functions within the river valley are the responsibility of the Romney Marshes Area internal drainage board.

== Route ==
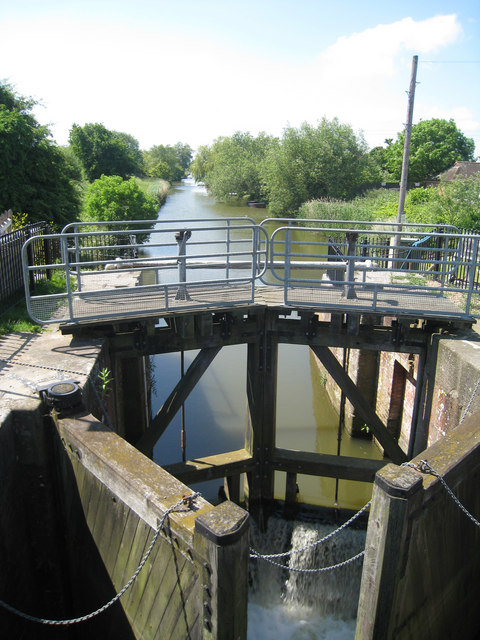
Brede Sluice in 2009 looking inland. The gates prevent the free movement of fish, which contributes to the river's poor water quality rating.

The Brede rises from several springs to the south of Netherfield, close to the 360-foot (110 m) and 330-foot (100 m) contours. They join together, and flow initially to the south east, before turning to the north east, to pass under a minor road and the A2100, by which time the river is already below the 100-foot (30 m) contour. At Pond Bay, Rat Gill joins the river, which turns to the east, to pass under a railway bridge on the Hastings Line. The River Line joins it at Whatlington, as do several more streams as it passes under the A21 and B2244 roads to the south of Sedlescombe. To the south of the river is the Pestalozzi International Village, formerly the Pestalozzi Children's Village, set up by a Trust following the end of the Second World War. The river channel is now flanked by drainage ditches on both sides, and soon drops below the 16-foot (5 m) contour.

A little further to the east is Brede Valley Waterworks, situated on the north bank. It was built in the early 1900s, and parts of it are grade II listed. The red-brick engine house still contains one of the original Tangye triple-expansion steam engines supplied in 1904, while a later building, dating from the 1930s, houses a Worthington-Simpson pumping engine dating from 1940. Before Brede Bridge, there is a derelict pumping station, which formerly pumped water from the drains into the main channel. An area of 60 acres (24 ha) is being returned to marshland, and water levels are gradually rising to recreate a traditional waterside landscape. The bridge is a modern structure with a flat concrete deck, which was built to replace a hump-backed bridge during the Second World War, to allow tanks to cross it. Beyond the bridge, Doleham Ditch joins from the south, and the Marshlink railway line which has followed the valley of a stream northwards, turns to the east to follow the Brede Valley. The valley floor widens, and a network of drains keeps this area, which is known as the Brede Level, from flooding.

As the river passes to the north of Icklesham, the railway crosses to the north bank of the channel. Another pumping station pumps water into the river from a network of drains to the south of the river, which soon reaches Winchelsea. Large areas of the town are listed as a Scheduled Ancient Monument Station Road, which leads to Winchelsea railway station, crosses the river at Ferry Bridge, and the A259 Royal Military Road, built in 1805 as part of the defensive Royal Military Canal crosses at Strand Bridge, on the eastern side of the town. Immediately beyond the bridge, the western section of the Royal Military Canal heads southwards towards Cliff End, near Pett. Like the town, it is an ancient monument. The Saxon Shore Way long-distance footpath follows its eastern bank, and continues to the south of the river.

After two meanders, and just before the channel turns sharply to the north, was the junction with the abortive New Harbour. It followed the course of the later Old River Way. As the river progresses towards Rye, there is a sewage treatment works on the east bank, and the remains of Camber Castle, which was built in 1538 by King Henry VIII, but abandoned in 1640 after the sea retreated. The structure and the grounds are a Scheduled Ancient Monument, and the remains have been restored and repaired since they were bought by the Department of National Heritage in 1977. To the north of the castle is Castle Water Nature Reserve. The site covers 220 acres (89 ha), and was bought by the Sussex Wildlife Trust in 1992. Gravel was extracted there between 1935 and 1970, and it now provides a valuable wetland habitat for birds. Brede Sluice is actually a lock, and leads into the Rock Channel, which was cut around the south side of Rye in the 1760s. At its far end, the river flows into the River Rother.

== Water quality ==
The Environment Agency measure the water quality of the river systems in England. Each is given an overall ecological status, which may be one of five levels: high, good, moderate, poor and bad. There are several components that are used to determine this, including biological status, which looks at the quantity and varieties of invertebrates, angiosperms and fish. Chemical status, which compares the concentrations of various chemicals against known safe concentrations, is rated good or fail.

The water quality of the Brede system was as follows in 2019.

| Section | Ecological Status | Chemical Status | Length | Catchment |
|---|---|---|---|---|
| Line | Moderate | Fail | 6.0 miles (9.7 km) | 8.04 square miles (20.8 km^{2}) |
| Vinehall Stream | Good | Fail | 1.4 miles (2.3 km) | 1.39 square miles (3.6 km^{2}) |
| Tributary of the Brede at Westfield | Good | Fail | 2.2 miles (3.5 km) | 5.06 square miles (13.1 km^{2}) |
| Doleham Ditch | Moderate | Fail | 2.5 miles (4.0 km) | 6.31 square miles (16.3 km^{2}) |
| Brede | Poor | Fail | 19.9 miles (32.0 km) | 20.56 square miles (53.3 km^{2}) |

The reasons for the quality being less than good include sewage discharge and quarrying activities affecting the River Line, sewage discharge from a sewage treatment works and from industry on the Doleham Ditch, while the Brede itself suffers from sewage discharge, barriers which prevent fish accessing the river, and impounding of the water. Like most rivers in the UK, the chemical status changed from good to fail in 2019, due to the presence of polybrominated diphenyl ethers (PBDE) and mercury compounds, neither of which had previously been included in the assessment.

== Points of interest ==
| Point | Coordinates (Links to map resources) | OS Grid Ref | Notes |
|---|---|---|---|
| Source near Netherfield | 50.9390°N 0.4397°E | TQ715183 | |
| A2100 Bridge | 50.9329°N 0.4817°E | TQ744177 | |
| Hastings Line Bridge | 50.9376°N 0.4977°E | TQ755183 | |
| B2244 Sedlescombe Bridge | 50.9310°N 0.5357°E | TQ782176 | |
| Brede Waterworks | 50.9305°N 0.5795°E | TQ813177 | |
| Brede Bridge | 50.9280°N 0.5980°E | TQ826174 | |
| Udimore Sluice | 50.9309°N 0.6619°E | TQ871179 | |
| Marshlink Line Bridge | 50.9292°N 0.6769°E | TQ882178 | |
| Ferry Bridge, Winchelsea | 50.9296°N 0.7075°E | TQ903179 | |
| Junction with Royal Military Canal | 50.9256°N 0.7153°E | TQ909175 | |
| Site of New Harbour canal junction | 50.9251°N 0.7262°E | TQ916174 | |
| Brede Sluice | 50.9462°N 0.7314°E | TQ919198 | Entrance lock |
| Junction with River Rother | 50.9500°N 0.7394°E | TQ925203 | Mouth |

== Bibliography ==
- Clarke, Brian (1995). Brede Waterworks Tramway. Brede Steam Engine Society.
- Cumberlidge, Jane (2009). Inland Waterways of Great Britain (8th Ed.). Imray Laurie Norie and Wilson. ISBN 978-1-84623-010-3.
- Eddison, Jill; Gardiner, Mark, eds. (1995). Romney Marsh: the Debatable Ground. Oxford University Committee for Archaeology (Monograph 41). ISBN 978-0-947816-41-4.
- Gardiner, Mark (1995). Medieval Farming and Flooding in the Brede Valley (PDF). Romney Marsh Trust. Archived (PDF) from the original on 6 July 2017. (Chapter 10 of Eddison & Gardiner 1995)
- Hadfield, Charles (1969). The Canals of South and South-East England. David and Charles. ISBN 978-0-7153-4693-8.
- Martin, Ron (2008). "The Brede Navigation" (PDF). Sussex Industrial Archaeology Society. Archived from the original on 23 March 2014.
- Skempton, Sir Alec; et al. (2002). A Biographical Dictionary of Civil Engineers in Great Britain and Ireland: Vol 1: 1500 to 1830. Thomas Telford. ISBN 978-0-7277-2939-2.
- Vine, P.A.L. (1989). Kent and East Sussex Waterways. Middleton Press. ISBN 978-0-906520-72-7.
