= Thomas Braddock (priest) =

Anglican clergy member and translator

Thomas Braddock or Bradock (c. 1556–1607) was an Anglican clergyman of the 16th century, Headmaster of Reading School from 1588 to 1589 and a translator into Latin.

Born in 1556 in Southwark, the son of Thomas Bradoke, Braddock was attending Westminster School by 1570 followed by Greyfriars School. He matriculated as a pensioner from Corpus Christi College, Cambridge in June 1573 aged 17. He migrated to Caius College, Cambridge in May 1574 aged 18 before finally taking his degree at Christ's College, Cambridge in 1576-77 aged 20 or 21. He obtained his Master of Arts degree in 1580 and took a Bachelor of Divinity in 1593.

Braddock was a Fellow of Christ's College from 1579 to 1587. Braddock was sympathetic to the Puritan leanings in the Church of England. In 1579 he and the other Fellows of Christ's College signed a protest on behalf of Hugh Broughton, who had been deprived of his Fellowship by Dr. Edward Hawford, the Master. Braddock's signature can also be found on a letter from the Fellows to Lord Burghley thanking him for mediating in a dispute involving the Vice-Chancellor, Dr John Copcot against the non-conformist Sampson Sheffield for preaching an "erroneous and scandalous" sermon. He was ordained a Deacon in London in March 1580 and a priest at Ely in April 1580 and Proctor in 1584. He was incorporated at the University of Oxford in 1584. In March 1588 he was elected Headmaster of Reading School and resigned that post in April 1589. During his tenure at Reading one of his students was William Laud. Braddock's ecclesiastical appointments included being vicar of Stanstead Abbots in Hertfordshire from 1590 to 1593, where he married Elizabeth Graves in August 1593; Rector of Navenby in Lincolnshire from 1593 to 1599; and Rector of Wittersham in Kent to his death in 1607.

Today Braddock is mostly remembered for his translation into Latin of Apologia pro Ecclesia Anglicana, the confutation in six parts by John Jewel, Bishop of Salisbury against the criticisms of the Lollard dissenter Thomas Harding. Braddock's translation was published in Geneva in 1600 and was undertaken that foreign scholars and divines might be able to follow the controversy which Jewel's Apologia had caused since its first publication in 1562. Braddock dedicated his work to John Whitgift, Archbishop of Canterbury, ‘who has filled the diocese with learned men’. Braddock is also remembered for having given books from his own library to the library of Christ's College, where he had studied. A book inscribed with Braddock's signature from his library and with marginalia in his own hand was formerly in the Glenn Christodoulou Collection.
