= River Tillingham =

River in East Sussex, England

Tillingham
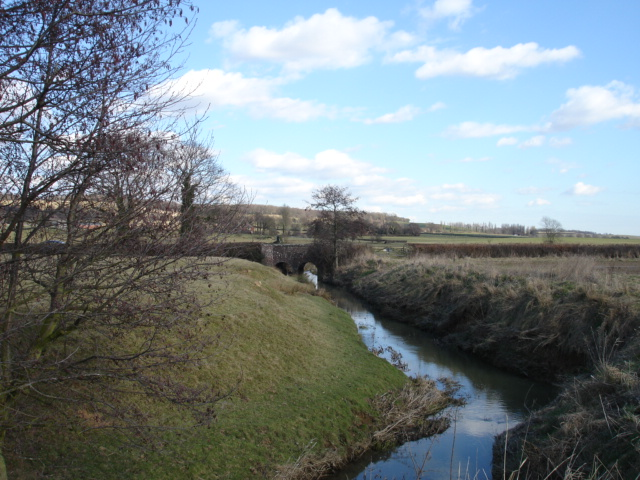
- The river at Beckley

Physical characteristics
- Source
  - location: East Sussex
- Mouth: River Brede
  - location: Rye, East Sussex
  - coordinates: 50.946958°N 0.731703°E
  - elevation: 0 m (0 ft)

The River Tillingham flows through the English county of East Sussex. It meets the River Brede and the eastern River Rother near the town of Rye. A navigable sluice controlled the entrance to the river between 1786 and 1928, when it was replaced by a vertical lifting gate which was not navigable. The river provided water power to operate the bellows of an iron works at Beckley Furnace, used to make cannons for the Royal Navy between 1578 and 1770, when it became uneconomic, and a water mill which replaced it, until that burnt down in 1909. The lower reaches supported a thriving shipbuilding industry from the early nineteenth century onwards, and although on a smaller scale, was still doing so in 2000.

== History ==
The ancient course of the Tillingham was rather different from its present one, as the river discharged into a broad area defined by islands, tidal creeks and salt marshes during the Roman period, rather than the estuary of the River Rother. The thirteenth century was a time of turmoil, as from the 1240s there was a period of 60 years when weather conditions were extreme. Old Winchelsea, which was built on a huge mound of shingle to the east of the mouth, was threatened with flooding, and ultimately succumbed. Following extensive flooding, including the washing away of the church on 1271, a new town was established further to the west on a hill near Iham, just to the south of the Tillingham, in 1280. In 1287, a great storm deposited large amounts of shingle and mud on the port of Romney, and blocked up the mouth of the River Rother, which carved out a new route to the sea near Rye, where it joined the Tillingham and the River Brede.

A major project of river engineering was carried out in 1596, when the course of the Rother was diverted around the northern edge of Rye to join the Tillingham. The scheme was expensive, and ultimately was not a success, as the Rother reverted to its previous course to the east on Rye in 1610. Another attempt at engineering the mouths of the three rivers began in 1723, when an Act of Parliament was obtained to authorise the construction of a new channel from the Brede near Winchelsea to the sea. After great expense and 63 years work, the channel, called the New Harbour, was opened in July 1787, and the old outlet to the sea was closed. A wet autumn caused extensive flooding of the hinterland, and in November 1787, after just four months, the New Harbour was abandoned, and the old channel from Rye to the sea was reopened. A navigable sluice was constructed across the Tillingham in 1786, just above Strand Quay. Its function was to prevent salt water flowing up the river, and to improve the scouring of the channel below it. At the same time, wharfs were constructed at Ferry Bridge, Leasam Farm, Marshall's Farm and Marley Farm, the final one around 2 miles (3.2 km) above the sluice. It is not entirely clear how the lock was used, since maps from 1872 carry a note that the sluice was the highest point to which tides flowed, but maps from 1898 and 1907 state that tides flowed for a further 3 miles (4.8 km) beyond the sluice when the lock gates were opened. Navigation on most of the Tillingham ended in 1928, when the sluice was replaced by a vertical lifting gate.

Shipbuilding had been carried out at Rye since at least 1223, although the location of the shipyards is not well defined. However, a number of firms are known to have owned and run shipyards on the lower reaches of the Tillingham and the Rock Channel. In the early nineteenth century, Harvey and Staffell were prominent, making cutters, schooners and sloops. By the middle of the century, James and Henry Hoad both built ships and operated them, and Hessel and Holmes were known for the quality of their ships. The Rother Iron Works built steam tugs and trawlers in the 1880s, while W E Clark built river barges in the 1890s. G and T Smith built ketches and smacks between 1890 and the start of the First World War. They built two steam drifters during the war, the only ships to be built at Rye during this period, and the same yard built pontoons which were used to detonate magnetic mines during the Second World War. They also built eight minesweepers, each 75 feet (23 m) long, of which two were despatched to Singapore. H J Phillips set up his yard in 1913, and the company survived two world wars and the depression of the 1930s, to continue building and repairing boats both for the fishing industry and the growing leisure industry. While on a smaller scale than in the past, there were still small shipyards operating in Rye in 2000.

== Route ==
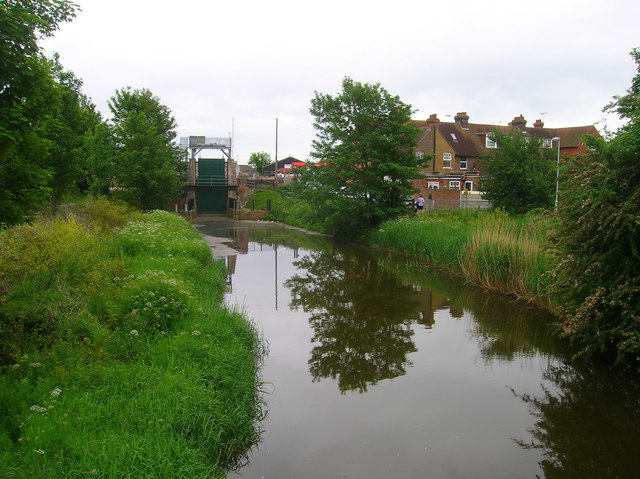
The vertical lifting gate at Tillingham Sluice, viewed from the upstream side

The River Tillingham rises from two springs near Staplecross, a small settlement in the parish of Ewhurst, East Sussex. Both are situated above the 300-foot (90 m) contour. The northern spring is beside the B2165 road, and the southern one beside Beacon Lane, and once they unite, the river flows broadly to the east. There is a sewage treatment works on its northern bank, before it passes under two minor roads, Ellenwhorne Lane and Watts Palace Lane. Several other streams join it in this area. Watts Palace Cottage, a two-storey, timber-framed building dating from the seventeenth century or maybe earlier, stands just to the south of the bridge. Already the river has dropped below the 115-foot (35 m) contour. It is joined by several more streams before it reaches Arnold Bridge on the A28 Northiam Road. Grade II listed timber-framed buildings dating from the seventeenth-century lie on both sides of the river, Maplestone Farmhouse to the north and a barn associated with Conster Manor Farm to the south.

Just before the next bridge is Beckley Furnace Farm. Between 1578 and 1770, this was the site of an iron works, which produced cannons for the Royal Navy. The bellows for the charcoal furnaces were water-powered, but the works was unable to compete with furnaces located near to coalfields, which used coke for fuel. After the demise of the furnace, a watermill was built on the site, and lasted until 15 April 1909, when it was destroyed in a fire. The river continues to the south east to reach Hundredhouse Bridge on Hundredhouse Lane. By the time it passes Billingham Wood, it is below the 16-foot (5 m) contour. The valley floor now opens out, and is crossed by numerous drainage ditches. The course turns briefly to the north east, and passes a series of lakes near Marley Farm, once the upper limit of navigation. It then forms a large loop, on which a westerly extension to Rye was built after the Second World War. As it enters Rye, it passes under Ferry Road and a bridge carrying the Marshlink railway line. There is a grade II listed smock mill beside the bridge, which dates from the 1930s. The original mill on the site was destroyed by fire in 1930, and under the terms of its lease, it had to be rebuilt. Tillingham Sluice is located just before the final bridge, which carries the A259 Winchelsea Road over the channel, and below it is Strand Wharf. The river then joins the River Brede, and both pass through the Rock Channel, to reach the River Rother, and the outlet to the sea.

In 1872, there was a gasworks located on the north bank of the river just above the sluice, while the area below that was called The Quay, where there was a Custom house and a shipbuilding yard. Towards the junction with the Brede was a large timber yard, and there was another shipbuilding yard on the Rock Channel. By 1898, there were additional timber yards on both banks below the sluice, and the Custom House had moved to the south bank. The southern end of the quay was occupied by steam-powered flour and saw mills. By 1907, the mill was described as a corn mill, and the southern timber yard had been turned into allotment gardens. By 1929, the timber yard on the south bank had become housing, as had the allotment gardens, but there was a new timber yard by the junction with the Brede. The Quay had been covered by a road system and warehouses by 1971, but there were still active shipyards on the Rock Channel.

== Water quality ==
The Environment Agency measure the water quality of the river systems in England. Each is given an overall ecological status, which may be one of five levels: high, good, moderate, poor and bad. There are several components that are used to determine this, including biological status, which looks at the quantity and varieties of invertebrates, angiosperms and fish. Chemical status, which compares the concentrations of various chemicals against known safe concentrations, is rated good or fail.

The water quality of the River Tillingham was as follows in 2019.

Section	Ecological Status	Chemical Status	Length	Catchment
Tillingham	Moderate	Fail	11.6 miles (18.7 km)	17.85 square miles (46.2 km^{2})

The reasons for the quality being less than good include sewage discharges from sewage treatment works and from agriculture and land management activities, together with physical modification of the channel for land drainage and flood protection, which restricts the free movement of fish within the river system. Like most rivers in the UK, the chemical status changed from good to fail in 2019, due to the presence of polybrominated diphenyl ethers (PBDE) and mercury compounds, neither of which had previously been included in the assessment.

== Points of interest ==
Point	Coordinates (Links to map resources)	OS Grid Ref	Notes
Source at Staplecross	50.9712°N 0.5358°E	TQ781221	
Watts Palace Lane bridge	50.9594°N 0.5694°E	TQ805209	
A28 Arnold Bridge	50.9591°N 0.5971°E	TQ824209	
Beckley Furnace	50.9599°N 0.6134°E	TQ836210	Iron works and watermill
Hundredhouse Bridge	50.9501°N 0.6313°E	TQ849200	
Marley Farm	50.9533°N 0.6988°E	TQ896205	limit of navigation
B2089 Ferry Bridge	50.9516°N 0.7260°E	TQ915204	
Tillingham Sluice	50.9499°N 0.7280°E	TQ917202	
Junction with River Brede	50.9470°N 0.7317°E	TQ919199	
End of Rock Channel	50.9501°N 0.7397°E	TQ925203	Junction with River Rother

== Bibliography ==
- Chantler, Bob. Kent and East Sussex River Walks. Bob Chantler.
- Collard, John (1998). Rye's Shipbuilding Industry. Rye Castle Museum. Archived from the original on 17 June 2016.
- Cumberlidge, Jane (2009). Inland Waterways of Great Britain (8th Ed.). Imray Laurie Norie and Wilson. ISBN 978-1-84623-010-3.
- Yates, Barry; Triplet, Patrick (2000). "Changes in Rye Bay" (PDF). East Sussex County Council. Archived from the original (PDF) on 3 March 2016.
