= George Digweed =

British sport shooter

George Digweed MBE (born 21 April 1964 in Hastings, Sussex), is a multi-World and European English sport shooter clay-shooting champion.

Digweed started shooting at about the age of 12. Taken out by his grandfather he was given a .410 shotgun to shoot with. Due to his competitive attitude he decided to get involved in competitive shooting. Digweed's first memorable competition win was the Home International Skeet Championships in 1986 at Melton Mowbray Gun Club.

He became the first man ever to shoot '100 straight' in a World Championship event and in October 2011, while being filmed for a programme for Fieldsports Channel TV and using standard cartridges, he broke a clay at 130 yards, breaking his own previous record set in America of 118 yards.

Digweed won his 16th World Championship title at the World Sporting Championship in Texas, USA on 25 and 26 April 2009, an event created in 2007 to find out who is the best all-round Shooting Champion in the world.

In 2009 he won the World Sporting Championship, the European Championship, the Mitsubishi World Series, the Pan African and the Italian Grand Prix.

In April 2022, he became the first sportsman to win a world title in five different decades (the 1980s, 1990s, 2000s 2010s and 2020s) when he won the Sporting World Championship.

He has now won 31 world titles (16 Sporting, 12 Fitasc and 2 Compak), 19 European titles (15 Fitasc and 4 Compak), 4 European Compak titles, and 14 world cups. George won 3 World Titles in 2015 - The World Sporting, The World FITASC and the World Compak - this has never been done in the history of Shooting.

George won another World Title at FITASC in July 2023. He also holds 4 current World Records. George holds the most World Championship Titles of anyone in any sport in the History of Sport. George raises huge amounts for Charity every year - to date he has raised nearly One Million Pounds for various Charities.

He and his wife Kate run a commercial shoot at Owley Farm, Wittersham, Kent.

George Digweed is the brother of DJ and record producer John Digweed.
