= Wittersham =

Village in Kent, England

Coordinates: 51.0151°N 0.706°E

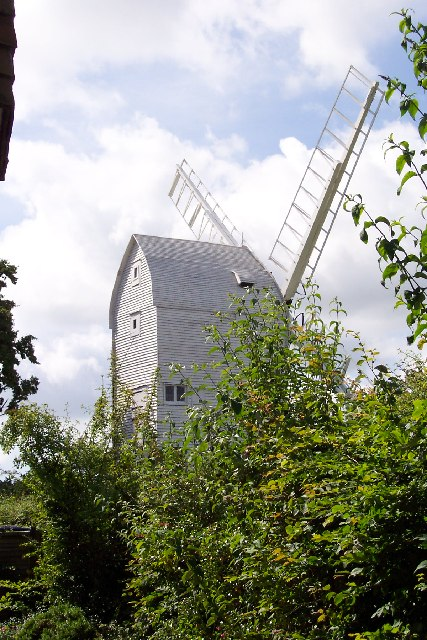
- Stocks Mill

- Location within Kent
- Area: 14.66 km^{2} (5.66 sq mi)
- Population: 1,173 (Civil Parish 2021)
  - Density: 80/km^{2} (210/sq mi)
- OS grid reference: TQ899274
- Civil parish: Wittersham
- District: Ashford
- Shire county: Kent
- Region: South East
- Country: England
- Sovereign state: United Kingdom
- Post town: TENTERDEN
- Postcode district: TN30
- Dialling code: 01797
- Police: Kent
- Fire: Kent
- Ambulance: South East Coast
- UK Parliament: Weald of Kent
- Website: Wittersham Parish Council

Wittersham is a small village and civil parish in the borough of Ashford in Kent, England. It is part of the Isle of Oxney and is situated within 2 miles of the East Sussex border.

== History ==
The Domesday Book of 1086 does not mention Wittersham, but it does assign the manor of Palstre to Odo, Bishop of Bayeux. Palstre was only one of four places in the Weald, apparently, that had a church. The Domesday Book entry reads:- "In Oxenai hundred, Osbern Paisforiere holds Palestrei, from the Bishop. It is taxed at three yokes. Arable land for two ploughs. In demesne, nine smallholders have half a plough. There is a church, 2 servants, 10 acres (40,000 m^{2}) of meadow, 5 fisheries at twelve pence, woodland for the pannage of 10 hogs. In the time of Edward the Confessor, it was worth forty shillings, now sixty shillings. Edwy the priest held it for King Edward."

An early variation of the village name may be Wyghtresham.

== Manor ==
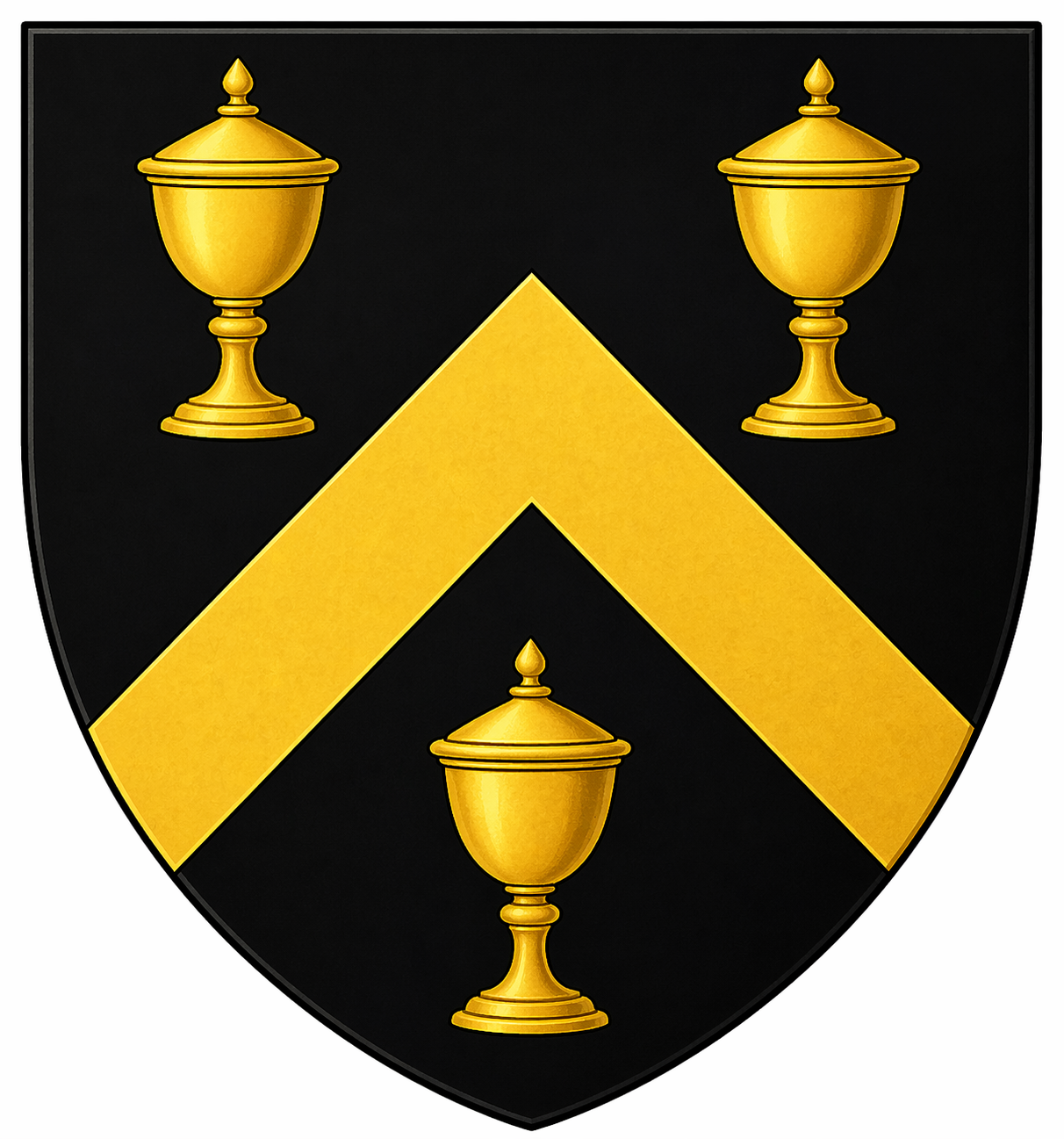
The Arms of the Odiarne family of Kent

The manor of Owlie (or Owley) was historically held by a family of the same name, until in the reign of Richard II it passed to the Odiarne family, who then themselves held it until the reign of Henry VIII when Thomas Odiarne died in 1529. The Arms of the Odiarne family could once be seen painted at the entrance to Wittersham parish church (Church of St John the Baptist). Thomas Odiarne's sons Thomas and John Odiarne, sold the manorial estate to John Mayney, Esq of Biddenden, and relocated to their other estates in the county (Bethersden, High Halden and later, Leeds). It stayed in the Mayney family until Sir John Mayney 1st baronet of Linton, sold it to Peter Ricaut in the reign of Charles I. After a succession of other owners, early in the 18th century, the manor came into the ownership of Thomas Brodnax or May of Godmersham Park, Kent. May changed his name to Knight after inheriting estates from the Knight family in 1738 and, on his death in 1781, Owley passed to his son Thomas. The younger Thomas Knight died childless in 1794, and Owley passed to his widow Catherine, later of White Friars, Canterbury. Mrs Knight was lady of the manor in 1799, when Hasted wrote. When she died in 1812, her husband's estates passed to his adopted son, Edward Austen Knight, brother of novelist Jane Austen, and owner of Chawton House in Hampshire.

Some time later, Edward Knight appears to have sold Owley to William Levett of Bodiam. When he died in 1842, Levett owned both the manors of Palstre (where he lived) and Owley. He left Paltre to his elder daughter Sabina and Owley to his younger daughter Emily. His Will devised to Emily "my freeholds, messuages, buildings, farm lands, containing altogether, by estimation, one hundred and seventy-two acres, more or less, situate lying and being in the Parish of Wittersham aforesaid, commonly called or known by the name of Owley Farm, with the apportionments thereto belonging". Emily Levett married Samuel Rutley, and the Rutley family continued to own the manor until the end of the 19th century.

At the turn of the 20th century, by which time holding the manor had ceased to be equivalent with ownership of most land and property, the Body family held Wittersham, Colonel Heyworth held Palstre, and Mrs Samuel Rutley owned Owley.

== Amenities ==
The village has a Public House, The Swan, and a restored white weatherboarded post mill, Stocks Mill.

Wittersham housed a key listening post for downed pilots over the channel during the Second World War; all that is left now is a small concrete house and a few craters dotted around from attacks by the Luftwaffe and several doodlebug (V1) strikes.

== Notable residents (past and present) ==
- Lord Alli - media entrepreneur and politician
- Laurence Alma-Tadema - novelist and poet
- Thomas Braddock - clergyman and translator lived and died in the village
- Gabrielle Margaret Vere Campbell - author who wrote under many pseudonyms, including Marjorie Bowen and Joseph Shearing
- Gerald Campion - TV actor and club owner
- Tom Chaplin - Keane singer
- George Digweed MBE - 16 times World Sporting Shooter Champion
- Norman Forbes-Robertson - Victorian Shakespearean actor
- William Gardner - English coin designer, engraver, calligrapher and writer
- Norman Hackforth - long-time accompanist to Sir Noël Coward. He was also the famous Mystery Voice for the panel game Twenty Questions.
- James Harris - father of Major Sir William Cornwallis Harris, military engineer, artist and hunter
- Robert Hichens - Edwardian novelist
- John Howlett - screenwriter and author
- Laurence Irving - grandson & biographer of the famous Victorian actor Sir Henry Irving
- William Jowitt - MP, lawyer and Lord Chancellor
- Alfred Lyttelton - MP, athlete, lawyer and sportsman
- Violet Markham - Liberal politician and women's activist
- Dave McKean - illustrator, photographer, comic book artist, graphic designer, filmmaker and musician
- Marti Pellow - singer with group Wet Wet Wet
- Sir Donald Sinden CBE - actor
- Marc Sinden - film director, actor and West End theatre producer
- Arthur Symons - Welsh-born Symbolist poet

== See also ==
- Listed buildings in Wittersham
