= Isle of Oxney =

Former island of England

Coordinates: 51°01′N 0°45′E

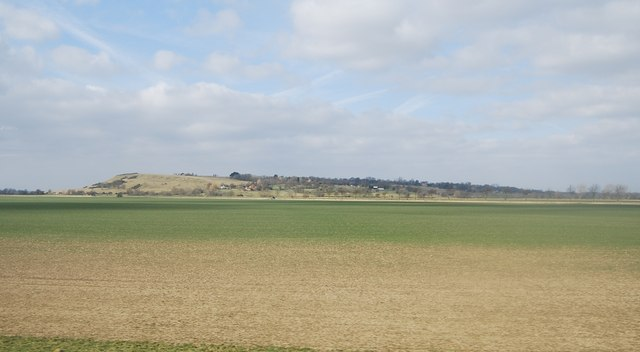
Looking towards the Isle of Oxney

Isle of Oxney is an area in Kent, England, close to the boundary with East Sussex.

Up to the 13th century, the island was part of the coastline bordering what is now the Romney Marsh. As that silted up, and until the later 17th century, the River Rother which enters the sea beyond Rye and flowed across Kent in a west–east direction, was in a channel to the north of the island. By the late 17th century, the river had changed its course to the south. The construction of the Royal Military Canal helped drain the remaining land connecting Oxney to the rest of Kent. Today the former sea and river channels are low-lying land, leaving the erstwhile island as high ground, but still retaining its name.

Places on the Isle of Oxney include Wittersham, Stone in Oxney and Stone-cum-Ebony.
