= Diocese of Canterbury =

Diocese of the Church of England

Diocese of Canterbury Dioecesis Cantuariensis
- Coat of arms

- Flag

Location
- Ecclesiastical province: Canterbury
- Archdeaconries: Canterbury, Ashford, Maidstone
- Coordinates: 51°16′47″N 1°5′0″E

Statistics
- Parishes: 231
- Churches: 327

Information
- Cathedral: Canterbury Cathedral

Current leadership
- Bishop: Sarah Mullally
- Suffragans: Rose Hudson-Wilkin, Bishop of Dover (pseudo-diocesan); Rob Munro, Bishop of Ebbsfleet (PEV); Luke Irvine-Capel, Bishop of Richborough (PEV)
- Archdeacons: Will Adam, Archdeacon of Canterbury; Darren Miller, Archdeacon of Ashford; Archdeacon of Maidstone (vacant)

Website
- canterburydiocese.org

The Diocese of Canterbury, also referred to as the See of Canterbury, (Note: The See of Canterbury is an important diocese and was seen as the centre of the Catholic church in England) is a Church of England diocese covering eastern Kent which was founded by St Augustine of Canterbury in 597. The diocese is centred on Canterbury Cathedral and is the oldest see of the Church of England.

== Bishops ==
The diocesan bishop is the archbishop of Canterbury. However, because of their roles as metropolitan bishop of the Province of Canterbury, Primate of All England and "first bishop" of the worldwide Anglican Communion, the archbishop (whose primary residence is at Lambeth Palace in London) is often away from the diocese. Therefore, their suffragan bishop, the bishop of Dover (presently Rose Hudson-Wilkin), is in many ways empowered to act almost as if she were the diocesan bishop.

The diocese had from 1944 to 2009 a second locally focussed suffragan bishop, the bishop of Maidstone (this version of the post was discontinued in November 2010), who had a similar though subordinate role to that of the Bishop of Dover. Two suffragans have nominal sees in the diocese — the bishops of Ebbsfleet and Richborough, who are provincial episcopal visitors with a wider focus than the diocese.

Besides the archbishop and the bishop of Dover, three honorary assistant bishops supervise and officiate. Alternative episcopal oversight (for parishes in the diocese who reject the ministry of priests who are women) is provided by the provincial episcopal visitor (PEV), the bishop suffragan of Richborough (Luke Irvine-Capel). There are three honorary assistant bishops licensed in the diocese:

- 2003–present: Michael Turnbull, retired former bishop of Durham and bishop of Rochester, lives in Sandwich.
- 2008–present: Richard Llewellin, retired former bishop at Lambeth (chief of staff for the archbishop at Lambeth Palace) and former bishop of Dover, lives in Canterbury.
- 2009–present: Graham Cray, retired archbishops' missioner and fresh expressions team leader and former bishop suffragan of Maidstone lives in Harrietsham.

== Diocesan structure ==
For organisational purposes, the diocese is divided into three archdeaconries, containing a total of sixteen deaneries, which are further subdivided into parishes: Canterbury Diocese comprises 202 parishes organised in 100 legal benefices.

Diocese	Archdeaconries	Rural deaneries
Diocese of Canterbury	Archdeaconry of Canterbury	Deanery of Canterbury
Diocese of Canterbury	Archdeaconry of Canterbury	Deanery of East Bridge
Diocese of Canterbury	Archdeaconry of Canterbury	Deanery of Reculver
Diocese of Canterbury	Archdeaconry of Canterbury	Deanery of Thanet
Diocese of Canterbury	Archdeaconry of Canterbury	Deanery of Stour Valley
Diocese of Canterbury	Archdeaconry of Ashford	Deanery of Ashford
Diocese of Canterbury	Archdeaconry of Ashford	Deanery of Dover
Diocese of Canterbury	Archdeaconry of Ashford	Deanery of Elham
Diocese of Canterbury	Archdeaconry of Ashford	Deanery of Romney
Diocese of Canterbury	Archdeaconry of Ashford	Deanery of Sandwich
Diocese of Canterbury	Archdeaconry of Ashford	Deanery of Vineyard
Diocese of Canterbury	Archdeaconry of Maidstone	Deanery of Maidstone
Diocese of Canterbury	Archdeaconry of Maidstone	Deanery of North Downs
Diocese of Canterbury	Archdeaconry of Maidstone	Deanery of Ospringe
Diocese of Canterbury	Archdeaconry of Maidstone	Deanery of Sittingbourne
Diocese of Canterbury	Archdeaconry of Maidstone	Deanery of Weald

== Churches ==
=== Extra-parochial areas ===
- Canterbury Old Castle Precincts (population 34)
- Canterbury St Augustine (population 444)
- Canterbury St John's Hospital (population 34)
- Canterbury St Nicholas Hospital (population 24)
- Canterbury The Archbishop's Palace Precinct (population 17)
- Canterbury The Mint (population 26)
- Canterbury The Ville of Christ Church (population 375): Christ Church Cathedral, Canterbury (medieval)
- Dover Castle (population 0): St Mary in Castro Proprietary Chapel (Saxon, deconsecrated 1690, restored 1862, serves the Dover Garrison)
- Dunkirk (population 7)

=== Archdeaconry of Canterbury ===
==== Deanery of Canterbury ====
- Benefice and Parish of St-Cosmas-and-St-Damian-in-the-Blean (population 4,202): SS Cosmas & Damian's Church, Blean (medieval)
- Benefice of Canterbury St Dunstan, St Mildred & St Peter
  - Parish of Saint Dunstan with Holy Cross (population 7,042): St Dunstan's Church (medieval) --- Holy Cross Church (medieval, redundant 1972)
  - Parish of Saint Peter with Saint Alphege and Saint Margaret and Saint Mildred with Saint Mary de Castro, Canterbury (population 3,055): St Peter's Church (medieval, closed 1928, reopened 1953) --- St Mildred's Church (medieval) --- St Alphege's Church (medieval, closed 1982) --- St Margaret's Church (medieval, closed C20th) --- St Mary de Castro Church (medieval, closed C16th) --- St Mary Bredman Church (medieval, rebuilt 1822, 1882, demolished 1900) --- St Andrew's Church (medieval, rebuilt 1774, closed 1888) --- St George the Martyr's Church (medieval, destroyed 1942) --- All Saints' Church (medieval, rebuilt 1828, closed 1902) --- St Mary Bredin Old Church (medieval, rebuilt 1867, destroyed 1942) --- St Mary Magdalene's Church (medieval, closed 1866) --- St John the Baptist's Church (medieval, closed C14th) --- St Edmund's Church (medieval, closed C14th) --- St Mary Northgate Church (medieval, rebuilt 1773, closed 1912) --- St Mary Queningate Church (medieval, closed C14th) --- St Michael's Church (medieval, closed C16th) --- St Pancras' Church (Saxon, closed)
- Benefice and Parish of Canterbury All Saints (population 8,195): All Saints' Church (1844)^{1} --- St Gregory's Church (1851, closed 1975)
- Benefice and Parish of Canterbury St Martin and St Paul (population 8,095): St Martin's Church (Saxon) --- St Paul's Church (medieval)
- Benefice and Parish of Canterbury St Mary Bredin (population 8,762): St Mary Bredin New Church (post-1942)
- Benefice and Parish of Hackington (population 9,042): St Stephen's Church, Canterbury (medieval)
- Benefice and Parish of Harbledown (population 5,810): St Michael and All Angels' Church, Harbledown (medieval) --- St Gabriel's Mission Church, Rough Common (1890)
- Benefice and Parish of Sturry with Fordwich and Westbere with Hersden (population 8,139): St Nicholas' Local Ecumenical Partnership, Sturry (medieval) --- All Saints' Church, Westbere (medieval) --- St Mary the Virgin's Church, Fordwich (medieval, closed 1995) --- St Alban's Church, Hersden (1930s, closed 1978)
- Benefice and Parish of Thanington (population 3,879): St Nicholas' Church (medieval) --- St Faith's Mission Church (C19th/20th, used occasionally)

^{1}dedicated to St Alban (as a Garrison Church) until 1976

==== Deanery of East Bridge ====
- Benefice of Barham Downs with Adisham and Aylesham
  - Parish of Adisham (population 640): Holy Innocents' Church (medieval)
  - Parish of Aylesham (population 6,402): St Peter's Church (1927)
  - Parish of Barham (population 1,494): St John the Baptist's Church (medieval)
  - Parish of Bishopsbourne (population 237): St Mary's Church (medieval)
  - Parish of Kingston (population 456): St Giles' Church (medieval)
  - Parish of Womenswold (population 293): St Margaret's Church (medieval)
- Benefice and Parish of The Bridge (population 3,242): St Peter's Church, Bekesbourne (medieval) --- St Peter's Church, Bridge (medieval) --- St Mary's Church, Patrixbourne (medieval) --- St Mary's Church, Lower Hardres (medieval, rebuilt 1832) --- St Mary's Church, Nackington (medieval)
- Benefice of Canonry
  - Parish of Ash with Westmarsh (population 3,335): St Nicholas' Church, Ash (medieval) --- Holy Trinity Church, Westmarsh (1841, closed 1968)
  - Parish of Chillenden with Knowlton (population 115): All Saints' Church, Chillenden (medieval) --- St Clement's Church, Knowlton (medieval, redundant pre-1991)
  - Parish of Elmstone with Preston and Stourmouth (population 1,254): Elmstone Parish Church (medieval) --- St Mildred's Church, Preston-next-Wingham (medieval) --- All Saints' Mission Church, Stourmouth (medieval, redundant 1979)
  - Parish of Goodnestone(-next-Wingham) (population 273): Holy Cross Church (medieval, rebuilt 1841)
  - Parish of Nonington (population 907): St Mary the Virgin's Church (medieval)
- Benefice of Little Stour
  - Parish of Ickham with Wickhambreaux and Stodmarsh (population 949): St John the Evangelist's Church, Ickham (medieval) --- St Mary's Church, Stodmarsh (medieval) --- St Andrew's Church, Wickhambreaux (medieval)
  - Parish of Littlebourne (population 1,620): St Vincent's Church (medieval)
  - Parish of Wingham (population 1,706): St Mary the Virgin's Church (medieval)

==== Deanery of Reculver ====
- Benefice and Parish of Herne (population 15,901): St Martin's Church (medieval) --- St Peter's Mission Church, Greenhill (1960s)
- Benefice and Parish of Herne Bay Christ Church (population 14,469): Christ Church (1841, parish church 1849, building 1835) --- St Andrew's Mission Church, Hampton (C20th) --- St John the Evangelist's Church, Herne Bay (1902, closed 1973)
- Benefice and Parish of Reculver (population 10,640): St Mary the Virgin's Church, Reculver (1813, rebuilt 1878) --- St Bartholomew's Church, Herne Bay (1908, rebuilt 1932, parish church 1936) --- Holy Cross Church, Hoath (medieval) --- St Mary's Old Church, Reculver (Saxon, destroyed 1809)
- Benefice and Parish of Whitstable (population 32,653): All Saints' Church (medieval) --- St Peter's District Church (1870s, rebuilt as parish church 1935) --- St Alphege's District Church (1840s) --- St Alphege's Old Church, Seasalter (medieval) --- St Alphege's New Church, Seasalter (2007) --- St John the Baptist's District Church, Swalecliffe (medieval, rebuilt 1875) --- St Andrew's Church, Whitstable?

==== Deanery of Stour Valley ====
Previously known as West Bridge.

- Benefice of Chartham and Upper Hardres with Stelling
  - Parish of Chartham (population 4,759): St Mary's Church (medieval)
  - Parish of Upper Hardres with Stelling (population 944): SS Peter & Paul's Church, Upper Hardres (medieval) --- St Mary's Church, Stelling (medieval)
- Benefice of King's Wood
  - Parish of Challock and Molash (population 1,336): SS Cosmas & Damian's Church, Challock (medieval) --- St Peter's Church, Molash (medieval)
  - Parish of Chilham (population 1,746): St Mary's Church (medieval)
  - Parish of Crundale (population 210): St Mary the Blessed Virgin's Church (medieval)
  - Parish of Godmersham (population 366): St Lawrence the Martyr's Church (medieval)
- Benefice of Wye
  - Parish of Boughton Aluph and Eastwell (population 1,868): All Saints' Church, Boughton Aluph (medieval) --- St Christopher's Church, Boughton Lees (1950s, building medieval, closed C21st)^{*} --- St Mary's Church, Eastwell (medieval, collapsed 1951)
  - Parish of Brook (population 352): St Mary's Church (medieval)
  - Parish of Petham (population 681): All Saints' Church (medieval, rebuilt 1922)
  - Parish of Upon The Hills (population 917): St James the Great's Church, Elmsted (medieval) --- St Mary the Virgin's Church, Hastingleigh (medieval) --- St Bartholomew's Church, Waltham (medieval)
  - Parish of Wye with Hinxhill (population 2,485): SS Gregory & Martin's Church, Wye (medieval, rebuilt 1711)^{1} --- St Mary's Mission Church, Hinxhill (medieval)

^{1}original dedication to St Gregory

==== Deanery of Thanet ====
- Benefice and Parish of Birchington with Acol and Minnis Bay (population 11,019): All Saints' Church, Birchington (medieval) --- St Mildred's Mission Church, Acol (1876) --- St Thomas' Mission Church, Minnis Bay (1932)
- Benefice and Parish of Broadstairs Holy Trinity (population 5,865): Holy Trinity Church (1830, parish church 1850)
- Benefice and Parish of Margate All Saints Westbrook (population 5,745): All Saints' Church (1882, rebuilt and parish church 1894)
- Benefice and Parish of Margate Holy Trinity (population 8,033): Holy Trinity New Church, Northdown Park (1959) --- Holy Trinity Old Church (1829, parish church 1842, destroyed 1943)
- Benefice and Parish of Margate St John the Baptist (population 15,328): St John the Baptist's Church (medieval)
- Benefice and Parish of Margate St Paul Cliftonville (population 8,263): St Paul's Church (1873)
- Benefice and Parish of Margate St Philip Northdown Park (population 3,380): St Philip's Church, Palm Bay (1993)
- Benefice and Parish of Ramsgate Christ Church (population 6,064): Christ Church (1847, services discontinued 2023, restarted 2025)
- Benefice and Parish of Ramsgate Holy Trinity (population 6,138): Holy Trinity Church (1845)
- Benefice and Parish of Ramsgate St George (population 4,628): St George the Martyr's Church (1824) --- St Paul's Church (1873, rebuilt 1887, closed 1940)
- Benefice and Parish of Ramsgate St Luke (population 6,470): St Luke's Church (1876)
- Benefice and Parish of Reading Street St Andrew (population 7,626): St Andrew's Church (1911)
- Benefice and Parish of St-Laurence-in-Thanet (population 21,337): St Laurence's Church, Ramsgate (medieval) --- St Mary's District Church, Cliffsend (1957) --- St Catherine's District Church, Manston (1874) --- St Christopher's District Church, Newington (1955) --- St Mark's Mission Church, Ramsgate (1884, rebuilt 1967)
- Benefice and Parish of St-Peter-in-Thanet (population 11,643): St Peter the Apostle's Church, Broadstairs (medieval)
- Benefice of Wantsum
  - Parish of Chislet (population 930): St Mary the Virgin's Church (medieval)
  - Parish of Minster-in-Thanet (population 3,944): St Mary the Virgin's Church (medieval)
  - Parish of Monkton (population 745): St Mary Magdalene's Church (medieval)
  - Parish of St-Nicholas-at-Wade with Sarre (population 1,104): St Nicholas' Church, St-Nicholas-at-Wade (medieval) --- All Saints' Church, Shuart (medieval, closed C16th) --- St Giles' Church, Sarre (medieval, closed C16th)
- Benefice and Parish of Westgate St James (population 6,523): St James's Church (1872)
- Benefice and Parish of Westgate St Saviour (population 6,691): St Saviour's Church (1884)

=== Archdeaconry of Ashford ===
==== Deanery of Ashford ====
- Benefice and Parish of Ashford Town (population 86,378): St Mary the Virgin's Church, Ashford (medieval) --- St Francis of Assisi's Church, South Ashford (1958) --- Christ Church, South Ashford (1867) --- St Mary's Church, Great Chart (medieval) --- St Mary's Church, Kennington (medieval) --- St Michael and All Angels' Church, Kingsnorth (medieval) --- St Mary's Church, Sevington (medieval) --- Singleton Community Church (C20th/21st, in village hall) --- SS Peter and Paul's Church, Shadoxhurst (medieval) --- St Francis' Mission Church, Stubbs Cross (C20th, irregular services only) --- St Mary the Virgin's Church, Willesborough (medieval)
- Benefice of Calehill with Westwell
  - Parish of Calehill (population 6,580): SS Peter & Paul's Church, Charing (medieval) --- Holy Trinity Church, Charing Heath (1872) --- St Mary's New Church, Little Chart (1955) --- St James's Church, Egerton (medieval) --- St Margaret's Church, Hothfield (medieval, rebuilt 1598) --- St Nicholas' Church, Pluckley (medieval) --- St Mary's Old Church, Little Chart (medieval, destroyed 1944)
  - Parish of Westwell (population 802): St Mary's Church (medieval)
- Benefice and Parish of Stour Downs (population 5,387): St Mary the Blessed Virgin's Church, Brabourne (medieval) --- St John the Baptist's Church, Mersham (medieval) --- St Peter's Church, Monks Horton (medieval) --- St Mary the Virgin's Church, Sellindge (medieval) --- St Mary's Church, Smeeth (medieval) --- St Mary the Virgin's Church, Stowting (medieval)

==== Deanery of Dover ====
- Benefice and Parish of Alkham with Capel Le Ferne and Hougham (population 3,151): St Anthony's Church, Alkham (medieval) --- St Radigund's Church, Capel-le-Ferne (C20th, rebuilt 1997) --- St Laurence's Church, Church Hougham (medieval) --- St Mary's Church, Capel-le-Ferne (medieval, redundant 1986)
- Benefice and Parish of Bewsborough (population 10,620): St Nicholas' Church, Barfreystone (medieval) --- St Pancras' Church, Coldred (medieval) --- SS Peter & Paul's Church, Eythorne (medieval) --- St Martin of Tours' Church, Guston (medieval) --- St Andrew's Church, Shepherdswell or Sibertswold (medieval, rebuilt 1863) --- St Peter's Church, Whitfield (medieval)
- Benefice of Dover Town
  - Parish of Buckland-in-Dover with Buckland Valley (population 12,521): St Andrew's Church, Buckland (medieval) --- St Nicholas' Church, Buckland Valley (1948, rebuilt 1960) --- St Barnabas' Church, Buckland, Dover (1901, parish church 1903, destroyed 1940s)
  - Parish of Dover Charlton (population 8,417): SS Peter & Paul's New Church (1893) --- SS Peter & Paul's Old Church (medieval, rebuilt 1827, demolished 1893) --- St Bartholomew's Church (1879, closed 1972)
  - Parish of Dover St Martin (population 7,178): St Martin's Church (1903, rebuilt 1910)
  - Parish of Dover St Mary (population 5,014): St Mary's Church (medieval, rebuilt 1844) --- Aycliffe Church Centre (C20th, closed 2020) --- St Peter's Church (medieval, closed C16th) --- St James's Old Church (medieval, destroyed 1940s) --- St James's New Church (1862, demolished 1953) --- Holy Trinity Church (1835, parish church 1841, destroyed 1940s) --- St Martin-le-Grand Church (medieval, closed C16th) --- Christ Church (1843, demolished C20th) --- St John the Baptist's Church (medieval, demolished 1537) --- St Nicholas' Church (medieval, closed C16th) --- St Martin-the-Less Church (medieval, closed C16th)
- Benefice and Parish of River (population 4,363): SS Peter & Paul's Church (medieval, rebuilt 1831)
- Benefice of St Margarets-At-Cliffe with Westcliffe and East Langdon with West Langdon
  - Parish of St-Margaret's-at-Cliffe (population 2,563): St Margaret of Antioch's Church (medieval)
  - Parish of The Langdons (population 607): St Augustine of Canterbury's Church, East Langdon (medieval) --- St Mary the Virgin's Church, West Langdon (medieval, rebuilt 1869, 1908)
  - Parish of Westcliffe (population 48): St Peter's Church (medieval)
- Benefice and Parish of Temple Ewell with Lydden (population 2,181): SS Peter & Paul's Church, Temple Ewell (medieval) --- St Mary the Virgin's Church, Lydden (medieval)

==== Deanery of Elham ====
- Benefice of Cheriton with Newington
  - Parish of Cheriton Street (population 10,434): All Souls' Church, Folkestone (1887, parish church 1892, rebuilt 1895)
  - Parish of Cheriton (population 4,694): St Martin's Church (medieval) --- Seabrook Mission Hall (1883, closed 2019)
  - Parish of Newington-next-Hythe (population 292): St Nicholas' Church (medieval)
- Benefice of Elham Valley
  - Parish of Acrise and Swingfield (population 1,387): St Martin's Church, Acrise (medieval) --- St Peter's Church, Swingfield (medieval, redundant 2000)
  - Parish of Denton and Wootton (population 261): St Mary Magdalene's Church, Denton (medieval) --- St Martin's Church, Wootton (medieval)
  - Parish of Elham (population 1,449): St Mary the Virgin's Church (medieval)
  - Parish of Lyminge with Paddlesworth (population 2,839): SS Mary & Ethelburga's Church, Lyminge (medieval) --- St Oswald's Church, Paddlesworth (medieval)
  - Parish of Postling (population 199): SS Mary & Radegund's Church (medieval)
  - Parish of Stanford (population 398): All Saints' Church (medieval, rebuilt 1878) --- St Mary's Church, Westenhanger (medieval, closed C16th)
- Benefice and Parish of Folkestone St Augustine, St Mary and St Eanswythe with St Saviour (population 13,717): St Augustine of Canterbury's Mission Church (1953) --- SS Mary & Eanswythe's Church (medieval) --- St Augustine of Canterbury's Old Mission Church (closed 1941) --- St Saviour's Church (1882, rebuilt 1893, closed C21st) --- Holy Cross Mission Church (1953, closed 1970s)
- Benefice and Parish of Folkestone St John the Baptist (population 9,085): St John the Baptist's Church (1877, parish church 1883)
- Benefice and Parish of Folkestone St Peter (population 3,548): St Peter's Church (1862, parish church 1868)
- Benefice of Folkestone Trinity
  - Parish of Folkestone Holy Trinity (population 5,489): Holy Trinity Church (1868) --- Christ Church (1850, destroyed 1942) --- Emmanuel Church (1882, closed 1910) --- St Michael & All Angels' Church (1865, rebuilt 1878, closed 1940)
  - Parish of Folkestone St George (population 4,280): St George's Church (1938)
  - Parish of Sandgate St Paul (population 3,032): St Paul's Church (1822, rebuilt 1849)
- Benefice and Parish of Hawkinge (population 8,601): St Luke's Lighthouse Church (2007) --- St Michael's Church (medieval, redundant 1980)
- Benefice and Parish of Hythe (population 9,800): St Leonard's Church (medieval) --- Holy Cross Church, Palmarsh (1958) --- St Michael's Local Ecumenical Partnership (LEP since 2011) --- St Michael & All Angels' Church (1893, closed 2011)
- Benefice of Lympne and Saltwood
  - Parish of Lympne (population 1,788): St Stephen's Church (medieval) --- St Mary's Church, West Hythe (medieval, closed C16th)
  - Parish of Saltwood (population 3,099): SS Peter & Paul's Church (medieval) --- Pedlinge Chapel of Ease (C19th, rebuilt 1903)

==== Deanery of Romney ====
- Benefice of Romney Marsh
  - Parish of Brenzett with Snargate (population 484): St Eanswith's Church, Brenzett (medieval) --- St Dunstan's Church, Snargate (medieval)
  - Parish of Brookland and Fairfield (population 509): St Augustine of Canterbury's Church, Brookland (medieval) --- St Thomas a Becket's Church, Fairfield (medieval)
  - Parish of Dymchurch with Newchurch and Burmarsh (population 4,749): All Saints' Church, Burmarsh (medieval) --- SS Peter & Paul's Church, Dymchurch (medieval) --- SS Peter & Paul's Church, Newchurch (medieval) --- Blackmanstone Parish Church (medieval, closed C16th) --- Orgarswick Parish Church (medieval, closed C16th) --- Eastbridge Parish Church (medieval, closed)
  - Parish of Ivychurch (population 251): St George's Church (medieval)
  - Parish of Lydd with Greatstone and Dungeness (population 6,337): All Saints' Church, Lydd (medieval) --- St Peter's Church, Greatstone-on-Sea (1953, rebuilt 1962) --- The Sanctuary, Dungeness (1954, closed 2014)
  - Parish of New Romney with Old Romney (population 7,689): St Nicholas' Church, New Romney (medieval) --- St Clement's Church, Old Romney (medieval) --- St Lawrence's Church, New Romney (medieval, demolished 1530s) --- St Martin's Church, New Romney (medieval, demolished 1550s) --- St Michael's Church, New Romney (medieval, closed pre-C16th) --- St John's Church, New Romney (medieval, closed pre-C16th) --- St Lawrence's Church, Old Romney (medieval, closed C13th) --- All Saints' Church, Hope (medieval, closed C17th) --- Midley Parish Church (medieval, closed C16th)
  - Parish of St-Mary-in-the-Marsh (population 162): St Mary the Virgin's Church (medieval)
  - Parish of St Mary's Bay (population 2,535): All Saints' Church, St Mary's Bay (1939)
- Benefice of Saxon Shoreline
  - Parish of Aldington (population 1,449): St Martin's Church (medieval)
  - Parish of Bilsington (population 278): SS Peter & Paul's Church (medieval)
  - Parish of Bonnington (population 152): St Rumwold's Church (medieval)
  - Parish of Kenardington (population 323): St Mary's Church (medieval)
  - Parish of Orlestone with Snave (population 1,778): St Mary's Church, Orlestone (medieval) --- Good Shepherd Local Ecumenical Partnership, Hamstreet (CoE since 1978) --- St Augustine's Church, Snave (medieval, redundant 1983)
  - Parish of Ruckinge (population 796): St Mary Magdalene's Church (medieval)
  - Parish of Warehorne (population 273): St Matthew's Church (medieval)

==== Deanery of Sandwich ====
- Benefice and Parish of Deal St Andrew (population 4,192): St Andrew's Church (1850, parish church 1852)
- Benefice and Parish of Deal St George (population 2,458): St George the Martyr's Church (1816, parish church 1852)
- Benefice and Parish of Upper Deal and Great Mongeham (population 17,369): St Leonard's Church, Deal (medieval) --- St Richard's Church, Deal (1934) --- St Martin's Church, Great Mongeham (medieval) --- St Nicholas' Church, Sholden (medieval)
- Benefice of Eastry and Woodnesborough
  - Parish of Eastry (population 2,373): St Mary the Blessed Virgin's Church (medieval)
  - Parish of Northbourne with Betteshanger and Ham (population 777): St Augustine's Church, Northbourne (medieval) --- St Mary the Virgin's Church, Betteshanger (medieval, rebuilt 1853, closed) --- St George's Church, Ham (medieval, redundant 1973)
  - Parish of Staple (population 556): St James the Great's Church (medieval)
  - Parish of Tilmanstone (population 321): St Andrew's Church (medieval) --- All Saints' Church, Waldershare (medieval, redundant 1980)
  - Parish of Woodnesborough (population 1,511): St Mary the Blessed Virgin's Church (medieval)
- Benefice of Sandwich and Worth
  - Parish of Sandwich (population 4,288): St Clement's Church (medieval) --- St Peter's Church (medieval, redundant 1973) --- St Mary's Church (medieval, closed 1950s)
  - Parish of Worth (population 1,291): SS Peter & Paul's Church (medieval)
- Benefice of Walmer and Cornilo
  - Parish of Cornilo (population 3,112): St John the Evangelist's Church, Kingsdown (1853) --- St Nicholas' Church, Ringwould (medieval) --- St Mary the Virgin's Church, Ripple (medieval, rebuilt 1861) --- SS Peter & Paul's Church, Sutton by Dover (medieval) --- Studdal Mission Hall (C19th/20th)
  - Parish of Walmer (population 7,065): St Mary's New Church (1888) --- St Saviour's Church (1849) --- St Mary's Old Church (medieval)

==== Deanery of Vineyard ====
(created 2024 out of the previous Deanery of Romney and Tenterden)

- Benefice of Biddenden and Smarden
  - Parish of Biddenden (population 2,623): All Saints' Church (medieval)
  - Parish of Smarden (population 1,433): St Michael the Archangel's Church (medieval)
- Benefice and Parish of Denswood (population 5,855): St Margaret's Church, Bethersden (medieval) --- St Mary the Virgin's Church, High Halden (medieval) --- All Saints' Church, Woodchurch (medieval)
- Benefice of Tenterden, Rother and Oxney
  - Parish of Appledore (population 794): SS Peter & Paul's Church (medieval)
  - Parish of Ebony (population 108): St Mary the Virgin's New Church, Reading Street (1858) --- St Mary's Old Church (medieval, closed C19th)
  - Parish of Newenden (population 209): St Peter's Church (medieval)
  - Parish of Rolvenden (population 1,599): St Mary the Virgin's Church (medieval)
  - Parish of Smallhythe (population 176): St John the Baptist's Church (medieval)
  - Parish of Stone-in-Oxney (population 382): St Mary the Virgin's Church (medieval)
  - Parish of Tenterden (population 8,016): St Mildred's Church (medieval) --- St Michael and All Angels' Church (1863)
  - Parish of Wittersham (population 1,174): St John the Baptist's Church (medieval)

=== Archdeaconry of Maidstone ===
==== Deanery of Maidstone ====
- Benefice and Parish of Allington and Maidstone St Peter (population 15,671): St Nicholas' Church, Allington (1937, rebuilt 1975) --- St Laurence's Church, Allington (medieval, closed 1969) --- St Peter's Church, Maidstone (1839, building medieval, redundant 1980s)
- Benefice and Parish of Maidstone Barming Heath (population 6,552): St Andrew's Church, Barming Heath (1907, dedicated 1925, parish church 1930)
- Benefice and Parish of Loose (population 6,160): All Saints' Church (medieval)
- Benefice and Parish of Maidstone All Saints St Philip with St Stephen Tovil (population 21,213): All Saints' Church (medieval)^{1} --- St Philip's Church (1856, parish church 1861) --- St Stephen's Church, Tovil, Maidstone (1839, demolished c. 1990) --- Holy Trinity Church (1826, parish church 1841, closed 1966) --- St John the Evangelist's Church (1861, closed 1971)
- Benefice and Parish of Maidstone St Faith (population 3,419): St Faith's Church, Ringlestone, Maidstone (1935, rebuilt and dedicated 2023) --- St Faith's Old Church, Maidstone (1872, closed 2022)
- Benefice and Parish of Maidstone St Luke (population 8,727): St Luke the Evangelist's Church (1886, parish church 1895, rebuilt 1897)
- Benefice and Parish of Maidstone St Martin (population 19,222): St Martin's Church, Shepway, Maidstone (1953, rebuilt 1957) --- St Hilary's Church, Shepway (1928, rebuilt 1934, closed 1950s) --- Christ Church, Parkwood, Maidstone (1966, closed C21st?)
- Benefice and Parish of Maidstone St Michael (population 6,614): St Michael and All Angels' Church, Maidstone (1876)
- Benefice and Parish of Maidstone St Paul (population 5,558): St Paul's Church, Maidstone (1859, rebuilt 1970)

^{1}original dedication to St Mary

==== Deanery of North Downs ====
- Benefice and Parish of Boughton Monchelsea (population 3,574): St Peter's Church (medieval) --- St Augustine's Mission Church (1874, closed 1981)
- Benefice of Len Valley
  - Parish of Boughton Malherbe (population 407): St Nicholas' Church (medieval)
  - Parish of Harrietsham (population 3,382): St John the Baptist's Church (medieval) --- Good Shepherd Mission Church (1881, sold C20th)
  - Parish of Lenham (population 3,511): St Mary's Church (medieval)
  - Parish of Ulcombe (population 939): All Saints' Church (medieval)
- Benefice of North Downs
  - Parish of Bearsted (population 7,628): Holy Cross Church (medieval)
  - Parish of Boxley (population 6,411): St Mary and All Saints' Church (medieval) --- St John's Church, Grove Green (C21st, in primary school)
  - Parish of Detling and Thurnham (population 1,099): St Martin of Tours' Church, Detling (medieval) --- St Mary the Virgin's Church, Thurnham (medieval)
  - Parish of Hollingbourne and Hucking (population 1,107): All Saints' Church, Hollingbourne (medieval) --- St Margaret's Church, Hucking (medieval)
  - Parish of Leeds and Broomfield (population 2,462): St Nicholas' Church, Leeds (medieval) --- St Margaret's Church, Broomfield (medieval) --- Kingswood United Church Local Ecumenical Partnership (C20th)
  - Parish of Otham with Langley (population 8,260): St Nicholas' Church, Otham (medieval) --- St Mary's Church, Langley (medieval)

==== Deanery of Ospringe ====
- Benefice of Boughton-Under-Blean with Dunkirk, Goodnestone with Graveney, and Hernhill
  - Parish of Boughton-under-Blean with Dunkirk (population 3,374): SS Peter & Paul's Church, Boughton-under-Blean (medieval) --- St Barnabas' Church, Boughton-under-Blean (1871, rebuilt 1896) --- Christ Church, Dunkirk (1840, redundant 1988)
  - Parish of Goodnestone with Graveney (population 393): All Saints' Church, Graveney (medieval) --- St Bartholomew's Church, Goodnestone (medieval, redundant 1985)
  - Parish of Hernhill (population 1,100): St Michael's Church (medieval)
- Benefice of Faversham
  - Parish of Brents and Davington (population 5,449): SS Mary Magdalene & Lawrence's Church, Davington (medieval) --- St John's Church, Brents, Faversham (1881, closed 2000)
  - Parish of Faversham (population 10,563): St Mary of Charity's Church (medieval)
  - Parish of Ospringe (population 2,417): SS Peter & Paul's Church (medieval)
  - Parish of Preston-next-Faversham (population 3,195): St Catherine's Church (medieval)
- Benefice of Kingsdown, Creekside and High Downs
  - Parish of High Downs (population 1,050): St Mary's Church, Eastling (medieval) --- St Mary's Church, Stalisfield (medieval) --- St Michael & All Angels' Church, Throwley (medieval)
  - Parish of Kingsdown and Creekside (population 6,372): The Beheading of St John the Baptist's Church, Doddington (medieval) --- SS Peter & Paul's Church, Lynsted (medieval) --- SS Peter & Paul's Church, Newnham (medieval) --- St Mary's Church, Norton (medieval) --- St Peter's Church, Oare (medieval) --- St Mary's Church, Teynham (medieval; also services in primary school) --- St Margaret's Church, Wychling (medieval) --- St Nicholas' Church, Buckland (medieval, ruined C18th) --- St Mary's Church, Stone-next-Faversham (medieval, ruined C16th) --- St Mary's Church, Luddenham (medieval, redundant 1972) --- St Catherine's Church, Kingsdown (medieval, rebuilt C19th)
- Benefice of Shepherds Lees
  - Parish of Badlesmere with Leaveland (population 239): St Leonard's Church, Badlesmere (medieval) --- St Laurence's Church, Leaveland (medieval)
  - Parish of Selling (population 866): St Mary the Virgin's Church (medieval)
  - Parish of Sheldwich (population 410): St James's Church (medieval)

==== Deanery of Sittingbourne ====
- Benefice and Parish of Borden (population 4,832): SS Peter & Paul's Church (medieval)
- Benefice and Parish of Eastchurch with Leysdown and Harty (population 8,120): All Saints' Church, Eastchurch (medieval) --- St Thomas the Apostle's Church, Harty (medieval) --- St Clement's Church, Leysdown (medieval, demolished 1980s)
- Benefice of Milton Regis with Murston, Bapchild and Tonge
  - Parish of Milton Regis (population 18,773): Holy Trinity Church (medieval)
  - Parish of Murston, Bapchild and Tonge (population 9,190): St Laurence's Church, Bapchild (medieval) --- All Saints' New Church, Murston (1874) --- St Giles' Church, Tonge (medieval) --- All Saints' Old Church, Murston (medieval, demolished 1874)
- Benefice and Parish of West Sheppey (population 38,793): SS Mary & Sexburga's Church, Minster-in-Sheppey --- Holy Trinity Church, Queenborough (medieval) --- Holy Trinity Church, Sheerness (1836, parish church 1851) --- St Peter's Church, Halfway (1925, rebuilt 1973, closed 2015) --- St Paul's Church, Sheerness (1872, demolished 1962) --- St George's Royal Dockyard Church, Sheerness (1828, rebuilt 1881, closed 1960s)
- Benefice of Sittingbourne with Bobbing
  - Parish of Sittingbourne Holy Trinity with Bobbing (population 6,090): Holy Trinity Church, Sittingbourne (1869, rebuilt 1873) --- St Bartholomew's Church, Bobbing (medieval)
  - Parish of Sittingbourne St Mary and St Michael (population 15,890): St Michael's Church, Sittingbourne (medieval) --- St Mary's Church, Milton Regis, Sittingbourne (1902, parish church 1925, closed 2010) --- St Paul's Church, Sittingbourne (1863, demolished 1955)
- Benefice of The Six
  - Parish of Hartlip (population 733): St Michael and All Angels' Church (medieval)
  - Parish of Iwade (population 3,526): All Saints' Church (medieval)
  - Parish of Lower Halstow (population 1,236): St Margaret's Church (medieval)
  - Parish of Newington-next-Sittingbourne (population 3,369): St Mary the Virgin's Church (medieval)
  - Parish of Stockbury (population 782): St Mary Magdalene's Church (medieval)
  - Parish of Upchurch (population 2,850): St Mary the Virgin's Church (medieval)
- Benefice of Tunstall and Bredgar
  - Parish of Bredgar with Bicknor (population 815): St John the Baptist's Church, Bredgar (medieval) --- St James's Church, Bicknor (medieval)
  - Parish of Frinsted (population 163): St Dunstan's Church (medieval)
  - Parish of Milstead (population 169): St Mary & Holy Cross Church (medieval)
  - Parish of Rodmersham (population 582): St Nicholas' Church (medieval)
  - Parish of Tunstall (population 2,560): St John the Baptist's Church (medieval)
  - Parish of Wormshill (population 185): St Giles' Church (medieval)

==== Deanery of Weald ====
- Benefice of Benenden and Sandhurst
  - Parish of Benenden (population 2,292): St George's Church (medieval, rebuilt 1861) --- St Margaret's Church, East End, Benenden (1892, closed C21st)
  - Parish of Sandhurst (population 1,427): St Nicholas' Church (medieval) --- Sandhurst Mission Church (C19th, rebuilt 1987)
- Benefice and Parish of Cranbrook (population 5,260): St Dunstan's Church (medieval)
- Benefice of Goudhurst with Kilndown
  - Parish of Goudhurst (population 2,315): St Mary's Church, Goudhurst (medieval)
  - Parish of Kilndown (population 761): Christ Church, Kilndown (1841)
- Benefice and Parish of Hawkhurst (population 4,916): St Laurence's Church (medieval) --- All Saints' Church, Highgate, Hawkhurst (1861, closed C20th)
- Benefice of Headcorn and the Suttons
  - Parish of Chart Sutton (population 932): St Michael's Church (medieval)
  - Parish of Headcorn (population 4,199): SS Peter & Paul's Church (medieval)
  - Parish of Sutton Valence (population 2,227): St Mary the Virgin's Church (medieval, rebuilt 1825) --- SS Peter & Paul's Church, East Sutton (medieval)
- Benefice and Parish of Marden (population 5,188): St Michael and All Angels' Church (medieval)
- Benefice of Sissinghurst with Frittenden
  - Parish of Frittenden (population 917): St Mary's Church (medieval)
  - Parish of Sissinghurst (population 1,409): Trinity Church (1838)
- Benefice and Parish of Staplehurst (population 6,654): All Saints' Church (medieval)

== Dedications ==
=== Medieval churches ===
- All Saints: Biddenden, Birchington, Boughton Aluph, Burmarsh, Canterbury, Chillenden, Eastchurch, Graveney, Hollingbourne, Hope, Iwade, Loose, Lydd, Murston, Petham, Shuart, Stanford, Staplehurst, Stourmouth, Ulcombe, Waldershare, Westbere, Whitstable, Woodchurch
- Beheading of John the Baptist: Doddington
- Christ Church: Canterbury Cathedral
- Holy Cross: Bearsted, Canterbury, Goodnestone (Dover), Hoath
- Holy Innocents: Adisham
- Holy Trinity: Milton Regis, Queenborough
- St Alphege: Canterbury, Seasalter
- St Andrew: Buckland, Canterbury, Shepherdswell, Tilmanstone, Wickhambreaux
- St Anthony: Alkham
- St Augustine of Canterbury: Brookland, East Langdon, Northbourne, Snave
- St Bartholomew: Bobbing, Goodnestone (Swale), Waltham
- St Catherine: Kingsdown, Preston-next-Faversham
- St Clement: Knowlton, Leysdown, Old Romney, Sandwich
- SS Cosmas & Damian: Blean, Challock
- St Dunstan: Canterbury, Cranbrook, Frinsted, Snargate
- St Eanswith: Brenzett
- St Edmund: Canterbury
- St George: Benenden, Canterbury, Ham, Ivychurch
- St Giles: Kingston, Sarre, Tonge, Wormshill
- St Gregory the Great: Wye
- St James the Great: Bicknor, Dover, Egerton, Elmsted, Sheldwich, Staple
- St John the Baptist: Barham, Bredgar, Canterbury, Dover, Harrietsham, Margate, Mersham, New Romney, Smallhythe, Swalecliffe, Tunstall, Wittersham
- St John the Evangelist: Ickham
- St Lawrence: Allington, Bapchild, Godmersham, Hawkhurst, Hougham, Leaveland, New Romney, Old Romney, St-Laurence-in-Thanet
- St Leonard: Badlesmere, Deal, Hythe
- St Margaret of Antioch: Bethersden, Broomfield, Canterbury, Hothfield, Hucking, Lower Halstow, St-Margaret's-at-Cliffe, Womenswold, Wychling
- St Martin: Acrise, Aldington, Canterbury, Cheriton, Detling, Dover (x2), Great Mongeham, Guston, Herne, New Romney, Wootton
- St Mary: Ashford, Betteshanger, Bishopsbourne, Brabourne, Brook, Canterbury (x5), Capel-le-Ferne, Chartham, Chilham, Chislet, Crundale, Dover (x2), Eastling, Eastry, Eastwell, Ebony, Elham, Faversham, Fordwich, Goudhurst, Great Chart, Hastingleigh, High Halden, Hinxhill, Kenardington, Kennington, Langley, Lenham, Little Chart, Lower Hardres, Luddenham, Lydden, Maidstone, Minster, Nackington, Newington-next-Sittingbourne, Nonington, Norton, Orlestone, Patrixbourne, Reculver, Ripple, Rolvenden, St-Mary-in-the-Marsh, Sandwich, Sellindge, Selling, Sevington, Smeeth, Stalisfield, Stelling, Stodmarsh, Stone-in-Oxney, Stone-next-Faversham, Stowting, Sutton Valence, Teynham, Thurnham, Upchurch, Walmer, West Hythe, West Langdon, Westenhanger, Westwell, Willesborough, Wingham, Woodnesborough
- SS Mary & Æthelburh of Kent: Lyminge
- St Mary & All Saints: Boxley
- SS Mary & Eanswith: Folkestone
- St Mary & Holy Cross: Milstead
- SS Mary & Radegund: Postling
- SS Mary & Seaxburh of Ely: Minster-in-Sheppey
- St Mary Magdalene: Canterbury, Denton, Monkton, Ruckinge, Stockbury
- SS Mary Magdalene & Lawrence: Davington
- St Matthew: Warehorne
- St Michael: Canterbury, Chart Sutton, Harbledown, Hartlip, Hawkinge, Hernhill, Kingsnorth, Marden, New Romney, Sittingbourne, Smarden, Throwley
- St Mildred: Canterbury, Preston-next-Wingham, Tenterden
- St Nicholas: Ash, Barfreystone, Boughton Malherbe, Buckland, Dover, Leeds, New Romney, Newington-next-Hythe, Otham, Pluckley, Ringwould, Rodmersham, St-Nicholas-at-Wade, Sandhurst, Sholden, Sturry, Thanington
- St Oswald: Paddlesworth
- St Pancras: Canterbury, Coldred
- St Paul: Canterbury
- St Peter: Bekesbourne, Boughton Monchelsea, Bridge, Canterbury, Dover, Monks Horton, Molash, Newenden, Oare, St-Peter-in-Thanet, Sandwich, Springfield, Westcliffe, Whitfield
- SS Peter & Paul: Appledore, Bilsington, Borden, Boughton-under-Blean, Charing, Charlton, Dymchurch, East Sutton, Eythorne, Headcorn, Lynsted, Newchurch, Newnham, Ospringe, River, Saltwood, Shadoxhurst, Sutton-by-Dover, Temple Ewell, Upper Hardres, Worth
- St Rumbold of Buckingham: Bonnington
- St Stephen: Hackington, Lympne
- St Thomas Becket: Fairfield
- St Thomas the Apostle: Harty
- St Vincent of Saragossa: Littlebourne
- No dedication/dedication unknown: Blackmanstone, Eastbridge, Elmstone, Midley, Orgarswick

=== Post-medieval churches ===
- All Saints: Hawkhurst (1861), Margate (1882), Murston (1874), St Mary's Bay (1939)
- All Souls: Folkestone (1895)
- Christ Church: Ashford (1867), Dover (1843), Dunkirk (1840), Folkestone (1850), Herne Bay (1841), Kilndown (1841), Maidstone (1966), Ramsgate (1847)
- Emmanuel: Folkestone (1882)
- Good Shepherd: Hamstreet (1978), Harrietsham (1881)
- Holy Cross: Folkestone (1953), Hythe (1958)
- Holy Trinity: Broadstairs (1830), Charing Heath (1872), Dover (1835), Folkestone (1868), Maidstone (1826), Margate (1829, 1959), Ramsgate (1845), Sheerness (1836), Sissinghurst (1838), Sittingbourne (1873), Westmarsh (1841)
- St Alban: Canterbury (1844), Hersden (1930s)
- St Alphege: Seasalter (2007), Whitstable (1840s)
- St Andrew: Deal (1850), Hampton (C20th), Maidstone (1925), Reading Street (1911)
- St Augustine of Canterbury: Boughton Monchelsea (1874), Folkestone (c1900, 1953)
- St Barnabas: Boughton-under-Blean (1871), Dover (1901)
- St Bartholomew: Dover (1879), Herne Bay (1908)
- St Catherine: Manston (1874)
- St Christopher: Boughton Lees (1950s), Newington (1955)
- St Faith: Maidstone (1872, 2023), Thanington (C20th)
- St Francis: South Ashford (1958), Stubbs Cross (C20th)
- St Gabriel: Rough Common (1890)
- St George: Deal (1816), Folkestone (1938), Ramsgate (1824), Sheerness (1828)
- St Gregory the Great: Canterbury (1851)
- St Hilary: Maidstone (1928)
- St James: Dover (1862), Westgate (1872)
- St John the Baptist: Folkestone (1877)
- St John the Evangelist: Faversham (1881), Grove Green (C21st), Herne Bay (1902), Kingsdown (1853), Maidstone (1861)
- St Luke: Hawkinge (2007), Maidstone (1886), Ramsgate (1876)
- St Margaret: Benenden (1892)
- St Mark: Ramsgate (1884)
- St Martin: Dover (1910), Maidstone (1953)
- St Mary: Canterbury (post-1942), Cliffsend (1957), Ebony (1858), Little Chart (1955), Sittingbourne (1902), Walmer (1888)
- St Michael: Folkestone (1865), Hythe (1893, 2011), Maidstone (1876), Tenterden (1863)
- St Mildred: Acol (1876)
- St Nicholas: Allington (1937), Buckland Valley (1948)
- St Paul: Margate (1873), Maidstone (1859), Ramsgate (1873), Sandgate (1849), Sheerness (1872), Sittingbourne (1863)
- St Peter: Aylesham (1927), Folkestone (1862), Greatstone (1953), Greenhill (1960s), Halfway (1925), Maidstone (1839), Whitstable (1870s)
- SS Peter & Paul: Charlton (1893)
- St Philip: Maidstone (1856), Margate (1993)
- St Radegund: Capel-le-Ferne (1997)
- St Richard: Deal (1934)
- St Saviour: Folkestone (1882), Walmer (1849), Westgate (1884)
- St Stephen: Maidstone (1839)
- St Thomas the Apostle: Minnis Bay (1932)
- No dedication: Aycliffe (C20th), Dungeness (1954), Kingswood (C20th), Pedlinge (C19th), Sandhurst (C19th), Seabrook (1883), Singleton (C20th/21st), Studdal (C19th/20th)

== Benefices by population ==
Benefice	Population	Churches	Clergy (Oct 2025)
Ashford	86,378	11	1 Team Rector, 3 Team Vicars, 2 Curates, 2 NSMs
West Sheppey	38,793	3	Vacant
Dover	33,130	5	2 Team Vicars, 1 NSM
Milton Regis w Murston, Bapchild & Tonge // Borden	32,795	5	Vacant (prev. 1 Joint P-in-C), 1 Curate, 2 NSMs
Whitstable	32,653	6	1 Team Rector, 2 Team Vicars, 2 Curates, 1 NSM
North Downs	26,967	12	1 Priest-in-Charge
Romney Marsh	22,716	14	1 Team Rector, 1 Team Vicar, 3 NSMs
Sittingbourne with Bobbing	21,980	3	Vacant, 1 NSM
Faversham	21,624	4	1 Vicar, 1 Curate
Ramsgate St Laurence in Thanet	21,337	5	1 Priest-in-Charge
Allington with Maidstone St Peter // Maidstone St Paul	21,229	2	1 Joint Priest-in-Charge
Maidstone All Saints St Philip with St Stephen Tovil	21,213	2	Vacant
Margate St John the Baptist // Margate All Saints	21,073	2	1 Joint Priest-in-Charge
Maidstone St Martin	19,222	1	1 Priest-in-Charge, 1 NSM
Upper Deal and Great Mongeham	17,369	4	1 Priest-in-Charge, 3 NSMs
Margate St Paul // Margate Holy Trinity	16,296	2	1 Joint Priest-in-Charge, 2 Curates, 1 NSM
Herne	15,901	2	1 Priest-in-Charge
Cheriton with Newington	15,420	3	1 Rector, 1 NSM
Herne Bay Christ Church	14,469	2	1 Vicar, 1 Curate, 1 NSM
Folkestone SS Augustine, Mary & Eanswythe	13,717	2	1 Priest-in-Charge
Wantsum // Westgate St Saviour	13,414	5	1 Joint Priest-in-Charge, 1 NSM
Folkestone Trinity	12,801	3	Vacant, 3 NSMs
The Six	12,496	6	Vacant, 1 NSM
Tenterden, Rother and Oxney	12,458	9	1 Team Rector, 1 Team Vicar, 1 NSM
Broadstairs St Peter in Thanet	11,643	1	1 Priest-in-Charge, 1 NSM
Ramsgate St Luke // Ramsgate St George	11,098	2	1 Joint Vicar/Priest-in-Charge, 1 Curate
Birchington with Acol and Minnis Bay	11,019	3	1 Priest-in-Charge, 1 NSM
Reculver	10,640	3	Vacant, 1 NSM
Bewsborough	10,620	6	1 Rector, 1 Curate
Ramsgate Holy Trinity // Deal St Andrew (under Bp of Richborough)	10,330	2	Vacant (previously 1 Joint Rector)
Walmer and Cornilo	10,177	8	1 Rector, 3 NSMs
Canterbury St Dunstan, St Mildred & St Peter	10,097	3	1 Rector
Hythe	9,800	3	1 Vicar, 1 Curate
Barham Downs with Adisham and Aylesham	9,522	6	1 Rector, 2 Curates
Folkestone St John the Baptist	9,085	1	1 Vicar, 1 Curate
Canterbury Hackington	9,042	1	1 Priest-in-Charge, 1 NSM, 1 Hon. Curate
Canterbury St Mary Bredin	8,762	1	1 Vicar, 1 Curate
Maidstone St Luke	8,727	1	1 Vicar, 2 Curates, 1 NSM
Hawkinge	8,601	1	1 Priest-in-Charge
Len Valley	8,239	4	Vacant
Canterbury All Saints	8,195	1	1 Priest-in-Charge, 1 Curate, 1 NSM
Sturry with Fordwich and Westbere with Hersden	8,139	2	Vacant
Eastchurch with Leysdown and Harty	8,120	2	Vacant (since 2016)
Canterbury St Martin and St Paul	8,095	2	1 Rector
Reading Street	7,626	1	1 Vicar
Kingsdown, Creekside and High Downs	7,422	10	1 Vicar, 1 Curate
Calehill with Westwell	7,382	7	1 Rector
Headcorn and the Suttons	7,358	4	Vacant
Staplehurst	6,654	1	1 Rector
Maidstone St Michael (under Bishop of Richborough)	6,614	1	1 Priest-in-Charge
Maidstone St Andrew	6,552	1	1 Priest-in-Charge
Elham Valley	6,533	8	1 Rector, 1 NSM, 1 OLM
Westgate St James (under Bishop of Ebbsfleet)	6,523	1	1 Priest-in-Charge
Wye	6,303	8	1 Vicar, 2 Curates, 1 OLM
Loose (under Bishop of Ebbsfleet)	6,160	1	1 Vicar, 1 Curate
Ramsgate Christ Church (under Bishop of Ebbsfleet)	6,064	1	Vacant (since 2021)
Canonry	5,884	6	1 Vicar, 1 NSM
Broadstairs Holy Trinity	5,865	1	Vacant
Denswood	5,855	3	1 Rector, 1 Curate
Canterbury Harbledown (under Bishop of Richborough)	5,810	2	1 Rector
Chartham and Upper Hardres with Stelling	5,703	3	1 Vicar
Sandwich and Worth	5,579	2	1 Rector, 1 NSM
Eastry and Woodnesborough	5,538	5	1 Rector, 1 NSM
Stour Downs	5,387	6	1 Vicar
Cranbrook	5,260	1	1 Vicar, 1 Curate
Marden	5,188	1	1 Vicar, 1 Curate
Saxon Shoreline	5,049	8	1 Rector
Hawkhurst	4,916	1	1 Vicar
Lympne and Saltwood	4,887	3	1 Rector, 1 NSM
Boughton, Dunkirk, Goodnestone, Graveney, Hernhill	4,867	4	1 Priest-in-Charge
Tunstall and Bredgar	4,474	7	1 Rector, 1 Curate
River	4,363	1	1 Priest-in-Charge, 1 NSM
Little Stour	4,275	5	1 Priest-in-Charge
Blean	4,202	1	1 Vicar, 1 NSM
Biddenden and Smarden	4,056	2	1 Priest-in-Charge
Thanington	3,879	2	1 Priest-in-Charge
Benenden and Sandhurst	3,719	3	1 Vicar, 1 NSM
King's Wood	3,658	5	1 Rector
Boughton Monchelsea	3,574	1	Vacant
Folkestone St Peter (under Bishop of Richborough)	3,548	1	Vacant
Maidstone St Faith	3,419	1	1 Priest-in-Charge
Margate St Philip	3,380	1	1 Vicar
Bridge	3,242	5	1 Vicar
St Margarets-At-Cliffe with Westcliffe and Langdons	3,218	4	Vacant (0.5FTE)
Alkham with Capel Le Ferne and Hougham	3,151	3	1 Priest-in-Charge
Goudhurst with Kilndown	3,076	2	1 Vicar
Deal St George	2,458	1	Vacant
Sissinghurst with Frittenden	2,326	2	1 Rector
Temple Ewell with Lydden	2,181	2	1 Priest-in-Charge
Shepherds Lees	1,515	4	1 Priest-in-Charge, 1 NSM
[Canterbury Cathedral	375	1	1 Dean, 2 Canons Residentiary]
[Dover Castle	0	1	1 Hon. Chaplain]

There are a total of 90 benefices (counting multiple benefices held simultaneously by the same cleric as one).

== Deaneries by population ==
Deanery	Population	Churches	Clergy (Oct 2025)	Popn. per stip. cl.
Thanet	141,476	26	3 Vicars, 7 Priests-in-Charge, 3 Curates, 4 NSMs	10,883
Sittingbourne	118,658	26	1 Rector, 1 Deanery Minister, 2 Curates, 4 NSMs	29,665
Ashford	99,147	24	2 Rectors, 4 Vicars, 2 Curates, 2 NSMs	12,393
Maidstone	93,136	10	2 Vicars, 5 Priests-in-Charge, 3 Curates, 2 NSMs	9,314
Elham	84,392	25	3 Rectors, 2 Vicars, 2 Priests-in-Charge, 2 Curates, 6 NSMs, 1 OLM	9,377
Reculver	73,663	13	1 Rector, 3 Vicars, 1 Priest-in-Charge, 3 Curates, 3 NSMs	9,208
Canterbury	66,221	15	3 Rectors, 2 Vicars, 3 Priests-in-Charge, 2 Curates, 3 NSMs, 1 Hon. Curate	6,622
Dover	56,663	21	1 Rector, 2 Vicars, 3 Priests-in-Charge, 1 Curate, 2 NSMs	8,095
Sandwich	45,313	21	3 Rectors, 1 Priest-in-Charge, 7 NSMs	11,328
North Downs	38,780	17	1 Priest-in-Charge	38,780
Weald	38,497	15	2 Rectors, 5 Vicars, 2 Curates, 1 NSM	4,277
Ospringe	35,428	22	2 Vicars, 2 Priests-in-Charge, 2 Curates, 1 NSM	5,905
Romney	27,765	22	2 Rectors, 1 Vicar, 3 NSMs	9,255
East Bridge	22,923	22	1 Rector, 2 Vicars, 1 Priest-in-Charge, 2 Curates, 1 NSM	3,821
Vineyard	22,369	14	2 Rectors, 1 Vicar, 1 Priest-in-Charge, 1 Curate, 1 NSM	4,474
Stour Valley	15,664	16	1 Rector, 2 Vicars, 2 Curates, 1 OLM	3,133
Totals	980,095	309	108 stipendiary clergy, 43 non-stipendiary	average: 9,075

== Archdeaconries by population ==
Archdeaconry	Population	Churches	Clergy (Nov 2025)	Popn. per stip. cl.
Ashford	335,649	127	36 stipendiary, 22 non-stipendiary	9,324
Maidstone	324,499	90	30 stipendiary, 8 non-stipendiary	10,817
Canterbury	319,947	92	42 stipendiary, 13 non-stipendiary	7,618

== Historical revenue ==
The Report of the Commissioners appointed by his Majesty to inquire into the Ecclesiastical Revenues of England and Wales (1835) noted the net annual revenue for the Canterbury see was £19,182. This made it the wealthiest diocese in England.

== See also ==
- John Wallis Academy — school in Ashford sponsored by the diocese
