= Grade I listed buildings in Folkestone and Hythe =

The district of Folkestone and Hythe within Kent

There are a number of Grade I listed buildings in the district of Folkestone and Hythe in Kent.

In the United Kingdom, the term listed building refers to a building or other structure officially designated as being of special architectural, historical or cultural significance; Grade I structures are those considered to be "buildings of exceptional interest". Listing was begun by a provision in the Town and Country Planning Act 1947. Listing a building imposes severe restrictions on what the owner might wish to change or modify in the structure or its fittings. In England, the authority for listing under the Planning (Listed Buildings and Conservation Areas) Act 1990 rests with English Heritage, a non-departmental public body sponsored by the Department for Culture, Media and Sport, while local authorities have a responsibility to regulate and enforce the planning regulations.

== Buildings ==
Name	Location	Type	Completed (Note: The date given is the date used by Historic England as significant for the initial building or that of an important part in the structure's description.)	Date designated	Grid ref. (Note: Sometimes known as OSGB36, the grid reference is based on the British national grid reference system used by the Ordnance Survey.) Geo-coordinates	Entry number (Note: The "List Entry Number" is a unique number assigned to each listed building and scheduled monument by Historic England.)	Image
Church of St Martin	Acrise	Parish Church	Late 11th century or 12th century	29 December 1966	TR1938542235; 51°08′14″N 1°08′05″E	1263009	Church of St Martin More images
Church of St Augustine	Brookland	Parish Church	Mid 13th, 14th, 15th and 18th century, restored 1790.	9 June 1959	TQ9894925807; 50°59′50″N 0°50′02″E	1230943	Church of St Augustine More images
Detached Belfry about 1 yard north of Church of St Augustine	Brookland	Bell Tower	Late 12th century or 13th century	9 June 1959	TQ9895225822; 50°59′51″N 0°50′02″E	1344151	Detached Belfry about 1 yard north of Church of St Augustine More images
Church of St Mary the Virgin	Elham	Church	Late 12th century	29 December 1966	TR1772543817; 51°09′08″N 1°06′43″E	1260547	Church of St Mary the Virgin More images
Church of St James	Elmsted	Bell Tower	Medieval	29 December 1966	TR1165844934; 51°09′52″N 1°01′33″E	1241752	Church of St James More images
Church of St Martin	Cheriton, Folkestone	Parish Church	Saxon	5 December 1974	TR1893836473; 51°05′09″N 1°07′29″E	1061197	Church of St Martin More images
Church of St Michael	Hawkinge	Church/House	19th century	29 December 1966	TR2280839689; 51°06′47″N 1°10′55″E	1242021	Church of St Michael More images
The Parish Church of St Leonard	Hythe	Parish Church	from circa 1100	3 January 1950	TR1614934915; 51°04′22″N 1°05′03″E	1068961	The Parish Church of St Leonard More images
Church of St George	Ivychurch	Parish Church	13th century	9 June 1959	TR0281227665; 51°00′45″N 0°53′24″E	1231321	Church of St George More images
Church of All Saints	Lydd	Parish Church	Saxon	28 November 1950	TR0427120953; 50°57′06″N 0°54′25″E	1068932	Church of All Saints More images
Church of St Mary and St Ethelburga, and remains of the older church to south	Lyminge	Abbey	Circa 633 founded	29 December 1966	TR1610740862; 51°07′35″N 1°05′13″E	1242122	Church of St Mary and St Ethelburga, and remains of the older church to south More images
Church of St Stephen	Lympne	Tower	Late 11th century	29 December 1966	TR1197534658; 51°04′20″N 1°01′28″E	1101780	Church of St Stephen More images
Lympne Castle	Lympne	House	Probably 13th century; mid 14th and 15th centuries, restored early 20th century.	29 December 1966	TR1192634661; 51°04′20″N 1°01′25″E	1101773	Lympne Castle More images
Monks Horton Priory	Monks Horton	House	From 12th century, restored early 20th century.	29 December 1966	TR1062639303; 51°06′51″N 1°00′28″E	1084377	Monks Horton Priory More images
Church of St Nicholas	New Romney	Church	Medieval	28 August 1951	TR0652924751; 50°59′06″N 0°56′28″E	1344057	Church of St Nicholas More images
Church of St Peter and St Paul	Newchurch	Parish Church	13th century	9 June 1959	TR0540731351; 51°02′41″N 0°55′44″E	1278140	Church of St Peter and St Paul More images
Church of St Clement	Old Romney	Parish Church	13th century	9 June 1959	TR0349525192; 50°59′25″N 0°53′54″E	1278132	Church of St Clement More images
Church of St Oswald	Paddlesworth	Parish Church	11th century or earlier	29 December 1966	TR1950639749; 51°06′54″N 1°08′05″E	1242255	Church of St Oswald More images
Church of St Mary and St Radegund	Postling	Parish Church	late 11th century or 12th century	29 December 1966	TR1454539092; 51°06′39″N 1°03′49″E	1356217	Church of St Mary and St Radegund More images
Bastions and curtain wall about 10 metres south-east of Saltwood Castle	Saltwood	Bailey	Late 14th century	27 August 1952	TR1617635915; 51°04′55″N 1°05′06″E	1356140	Bastions and curtain wall about 10 metres south-east of Saltwood Castle More images
Saltwood Castle	Saltwood	Bailey	possibly 11th century	27 August 1952	TR1617435915; 51°04′55″N 1°05′06″E	1344198	Saltwood Castle More images
Sandgate Castle	Sandgate	Castle	1539–40	5 December 1949	TR2068335173; 51°04′24″N 1°08′56″E	1061237	Sandgate Castle More images
Church of St Mary	Sellindge	Parish Church	Late 11th, 12th, and 13th centuries, restored mid-to-late 19th century	29 December 1966	TR0938438452; 51°06′26″N 0°59′23″E	1054042	Church of St Mary More images
Church of St Thomas a Becket and mounting block attached	Fairfield, Snargate	Parish Church	15th century, rebuilt 1912–13	9 June 1959	TQ9667126490; 51°00′15″N 0°48′07″E	1277450	Church of St Thomas a Becket and mounting block attached More images
Church of St Mary the Virgin	St. Mary in the Marsh	Parish Church	12th century	9 June 1959	TR0649227990; 51°00′51″N 0°56′33″E	1061102	Church of St Mary the Virgin More images
Barns at Westenhanger Manor	Westenhanger, Stanford	Barn	16th century or earlier	27 August 1952	TR1224937198; 51°05′41″N 1°01′47″E	1045888	Barns at Westenhanger Manor More images
Westenhanger Manor	Westenhanger, Stanford	Castle	14th century	27 August 1952	TR1236537163; 51°05′40″N 1°01′53″E	1344223	Westenhanger Manor More images
Church of St Mary	Stelling Minnis	Parish Church	Late 12th century or early 13th century	29 December 1966	TR1420648592; 51°11′47″N 1°03′52″E	1260110	Church of St Mary More images
Davison's Mill or Davison's Windmill	Stelling Minnis	Smock Mill	1866	29 December 1966	TR1462946488; 51°10′38″N 1°04′09″E	1260112	Davison's Mill or Davison's Windmill More images
Church of St Peter	Swingfield	Parish Church	Late 11th century or 12th century	29 December 1966	TR2328543423; 51°08′47″N 1°11′28″E	1242414	Church of St Peter More images

== See also ==
- Grade II* listed buildings in Folkestone and Hythe
