= St Leonard's Church, Hythe =

Parish church in Hythe, Kent, England

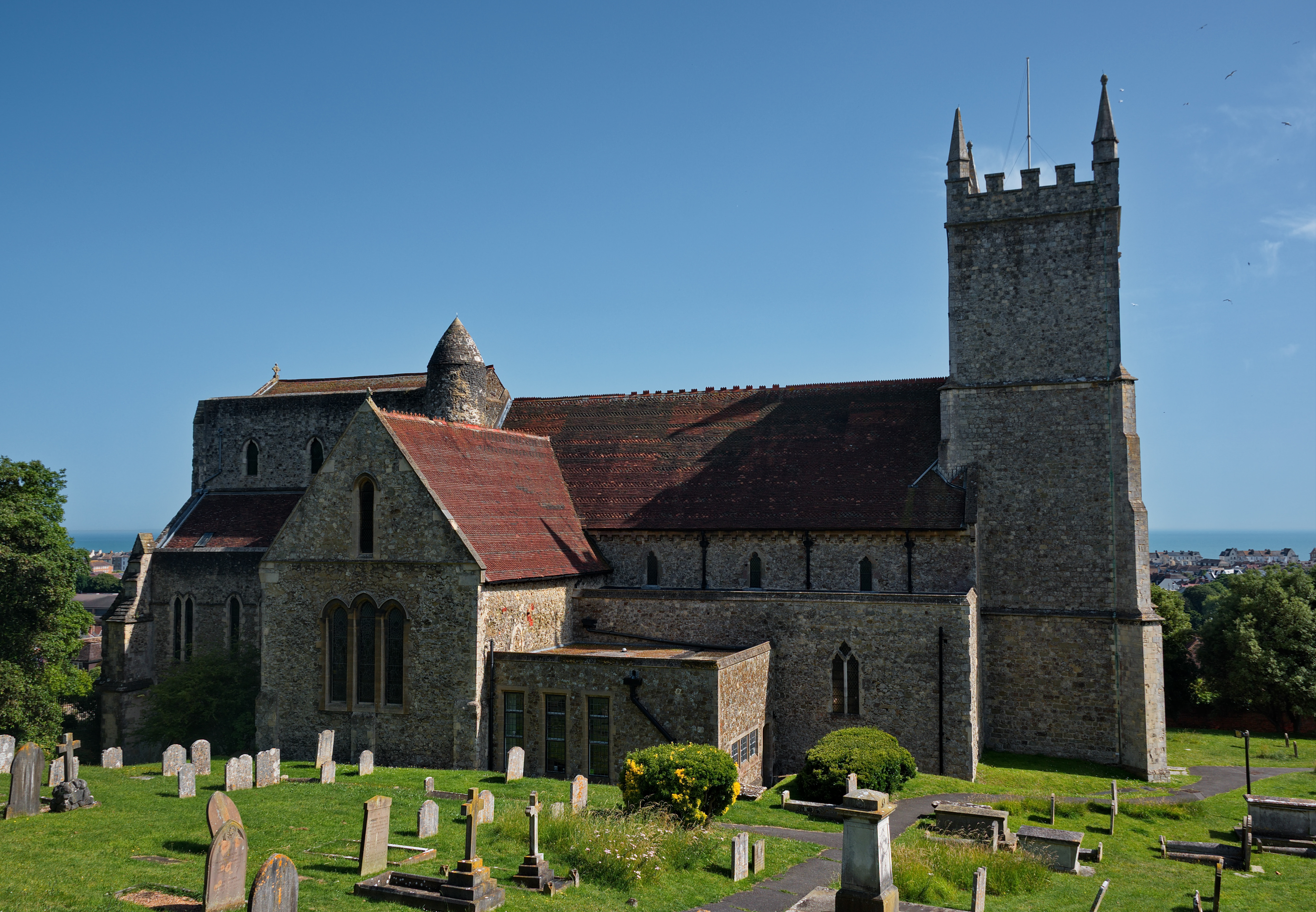
- The church viewed from the north

- Location within Kent
- 51°04′22″N 1°05′03″E
- OS grid reference: TR 16149 34915
- Location: Hythe, Kent
- Country: England
- Denomination: Anglican
- Website: slhk.org

History
- Status: Parish church

Architecture
- Functional status: Active
- Heritage designation: Grade I
- Designated: 3 January 1950
- Completed: Late 11th century

Administration
- Province: Canterbury
- Diocese: Canterbury
- Archdeaconry: Ashford
- Deanery: Elham
- Parish: Hythe

St Leonard's Church is a Church of England parish church in Hythe, Kent. It was originally built in the late 11th century and is a Grade I listed building.

== Building ==
The large 11th-century church is up the hill; the tower at its western end was destroyed by an earth tremor in 1739 and restored in 1750.

On pillars on the south side of the nave is mediaeval graffiti depicting ships. The vestry door, on the north side of the nave is an early Norman doorway. It has been suggested that this, which in late mediaeval times was apparently on the outer wall of the church, was once an internal wall, with the earlier Norman church a stage higher up the hill. This would make the existing chapel of St Edmund (or north transept) the original chancel, with the original nave being on the other side of the north wall. Evidence of earlier masonry is visible on the north wall. Going round into the north transept, it is clear that Roman masonry was re-used in the building of the arch, which is narrow and late-Saxon in style. At the time of Hasted's 'History of Kent' this doorway was blocked up and not visible on the inside.

A new vestry was added in 1959.

== History ==
St Leonard's Church was originally completed in the late 11th Century.

== Burials and memorials ==
Lionel Lukin, credited with inventing the self-righting lifeboat, is buried in the parish churchyard.

== Ossuary ==
St Leonard's Church is one of only two churches in England to contain a surviving ossuary, the other being Holy Trinity church in Rothwell, Northamptonshire. It has "the largest and best-preserved collection of ancient human skulls and bones in Britain". The chancel, from 1220, covers a processional ossuary (a bone store, more commonly found on the continent) lined with 2,000 skulls and 8,000 thigh bones. They date from the mediaeval period, probably having been stored after removal, to make way for new graves. This was common in England, but bones were usually dispersed, and this is thus a rare collection. Several of the skulls show marks of trepanning.

The ossuary is estimated to contain the remains of around 2000–4000 individuals.

== Gallery ==
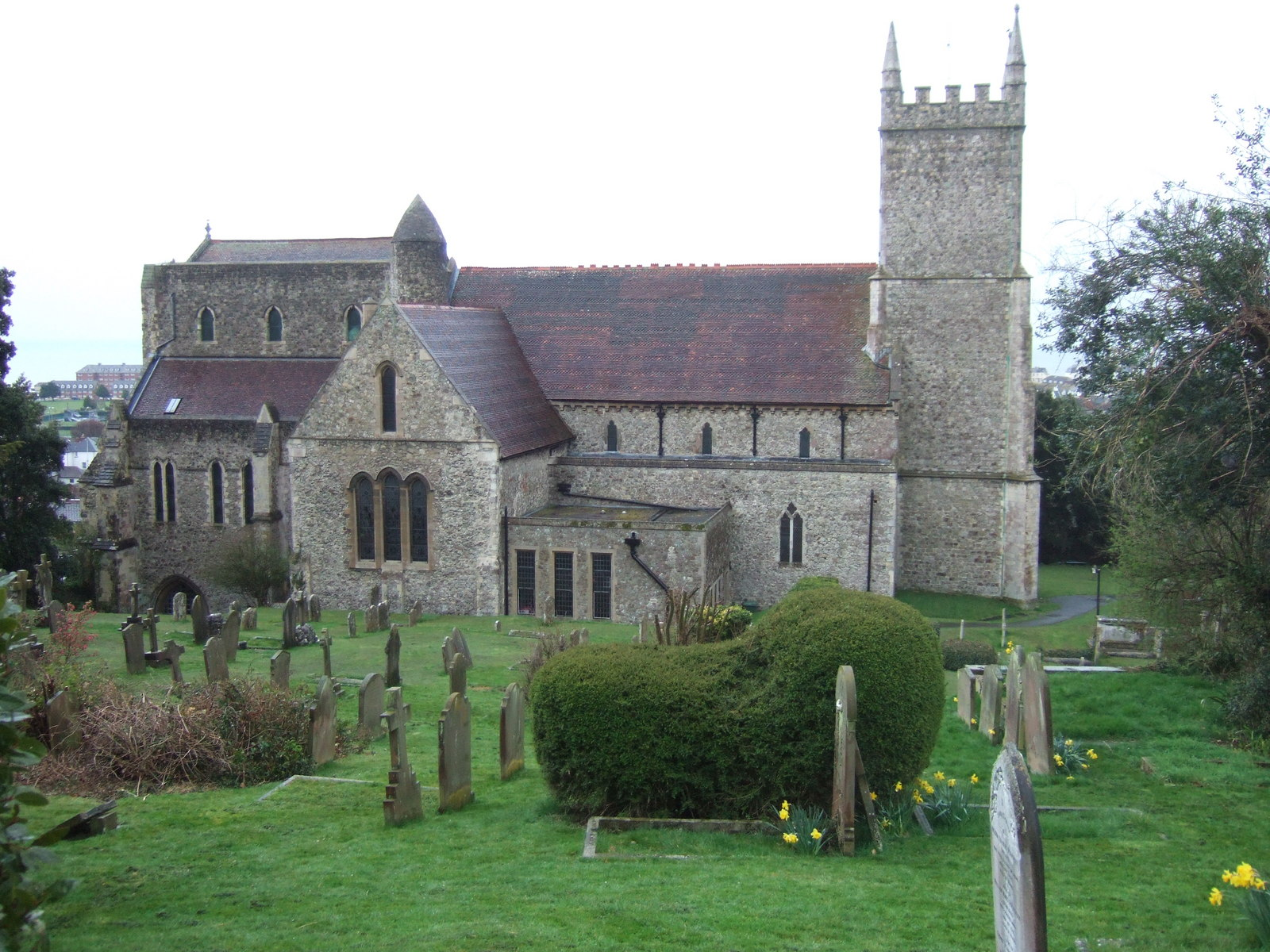
The church viewed from the north

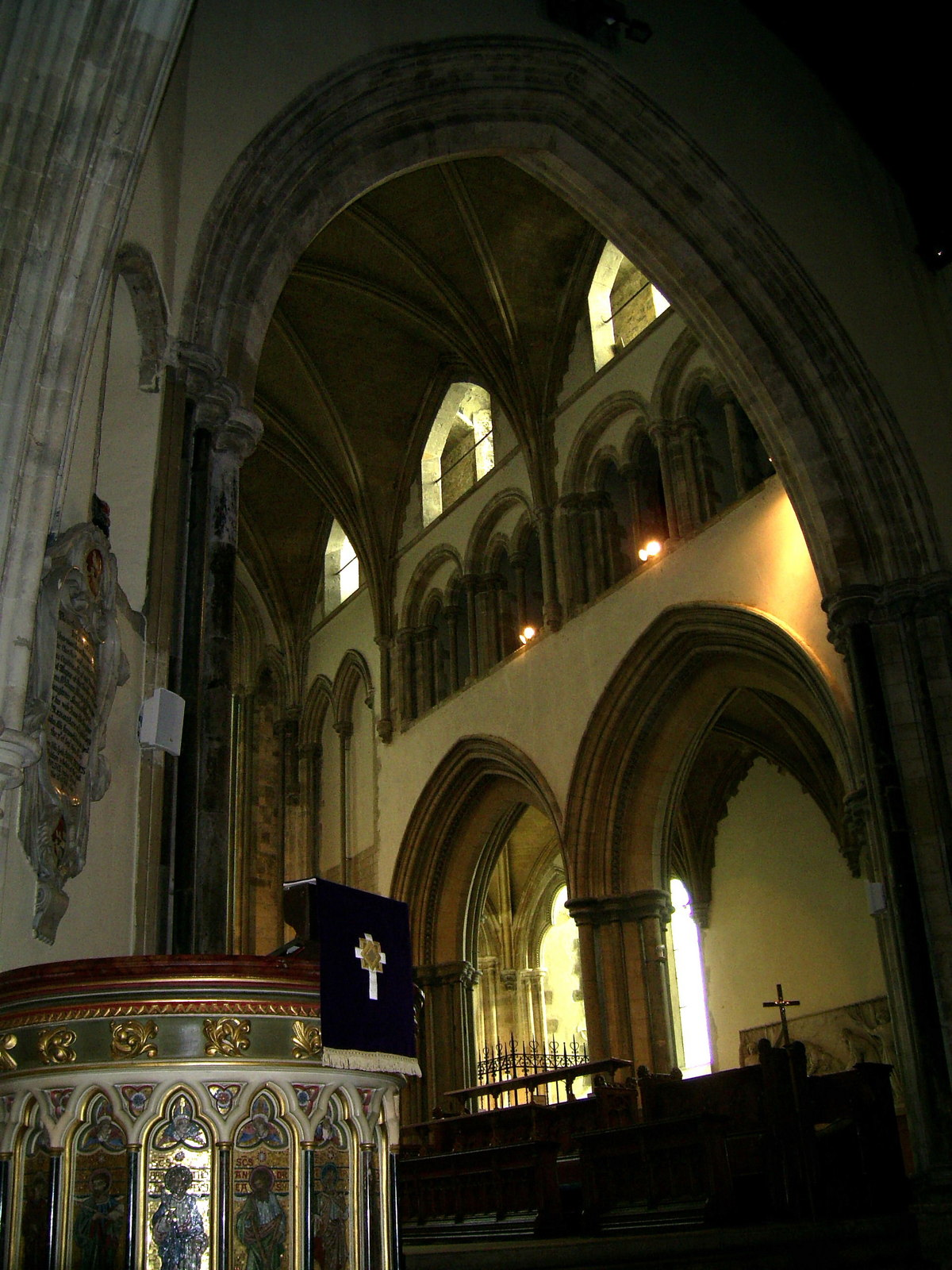
Interior

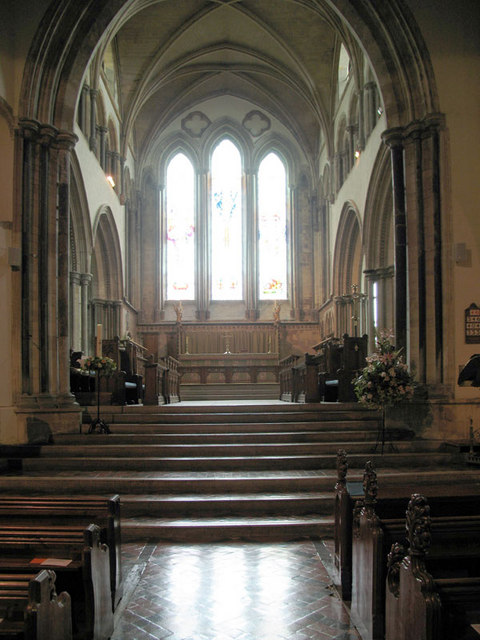
The chancel

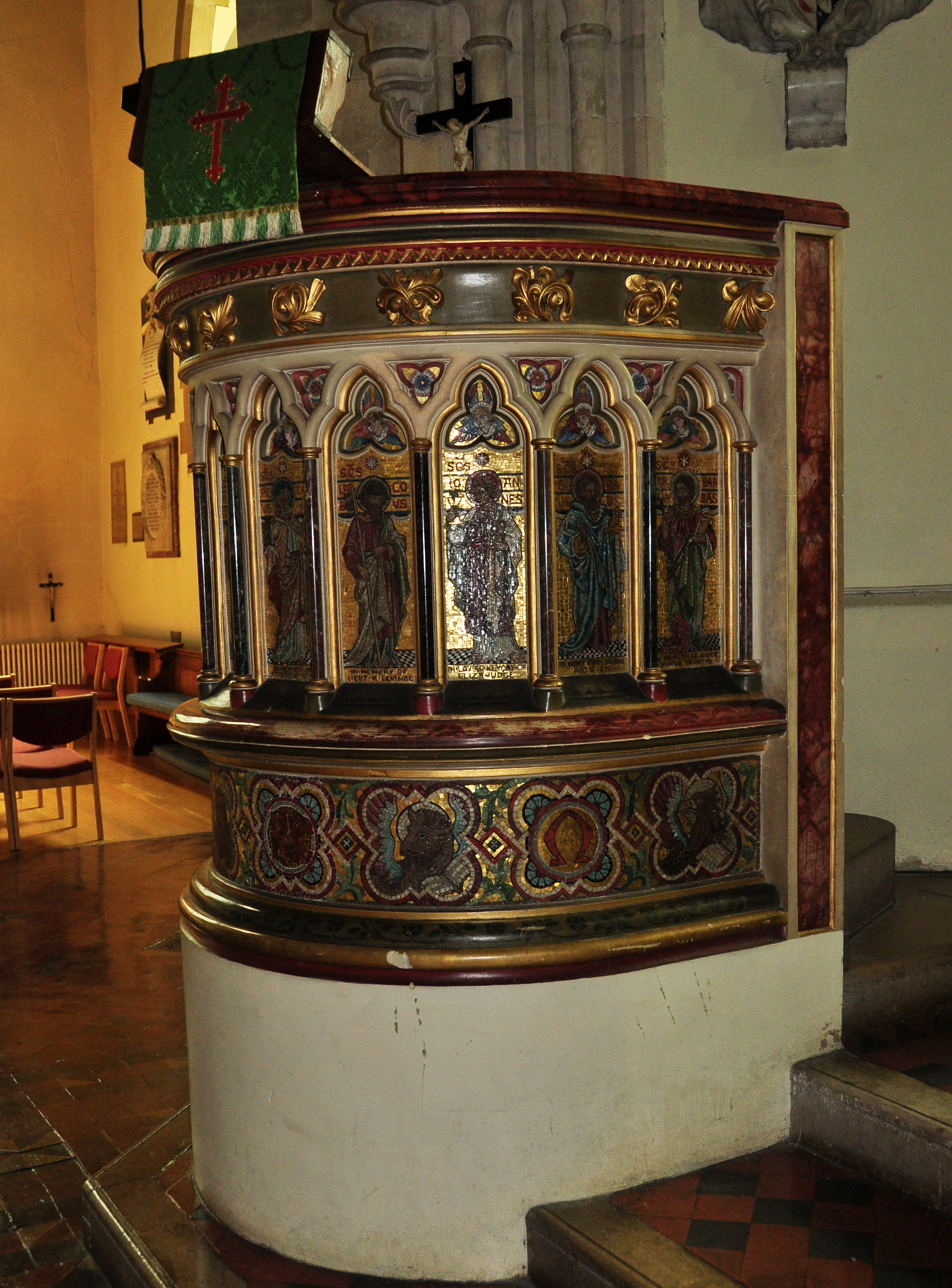
The pulpit

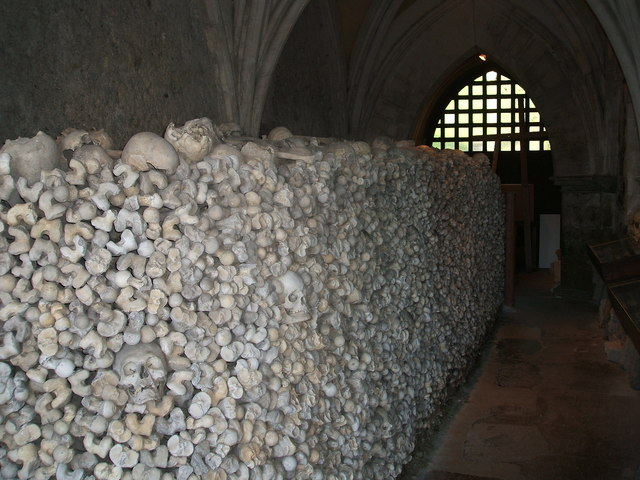
The ossuary

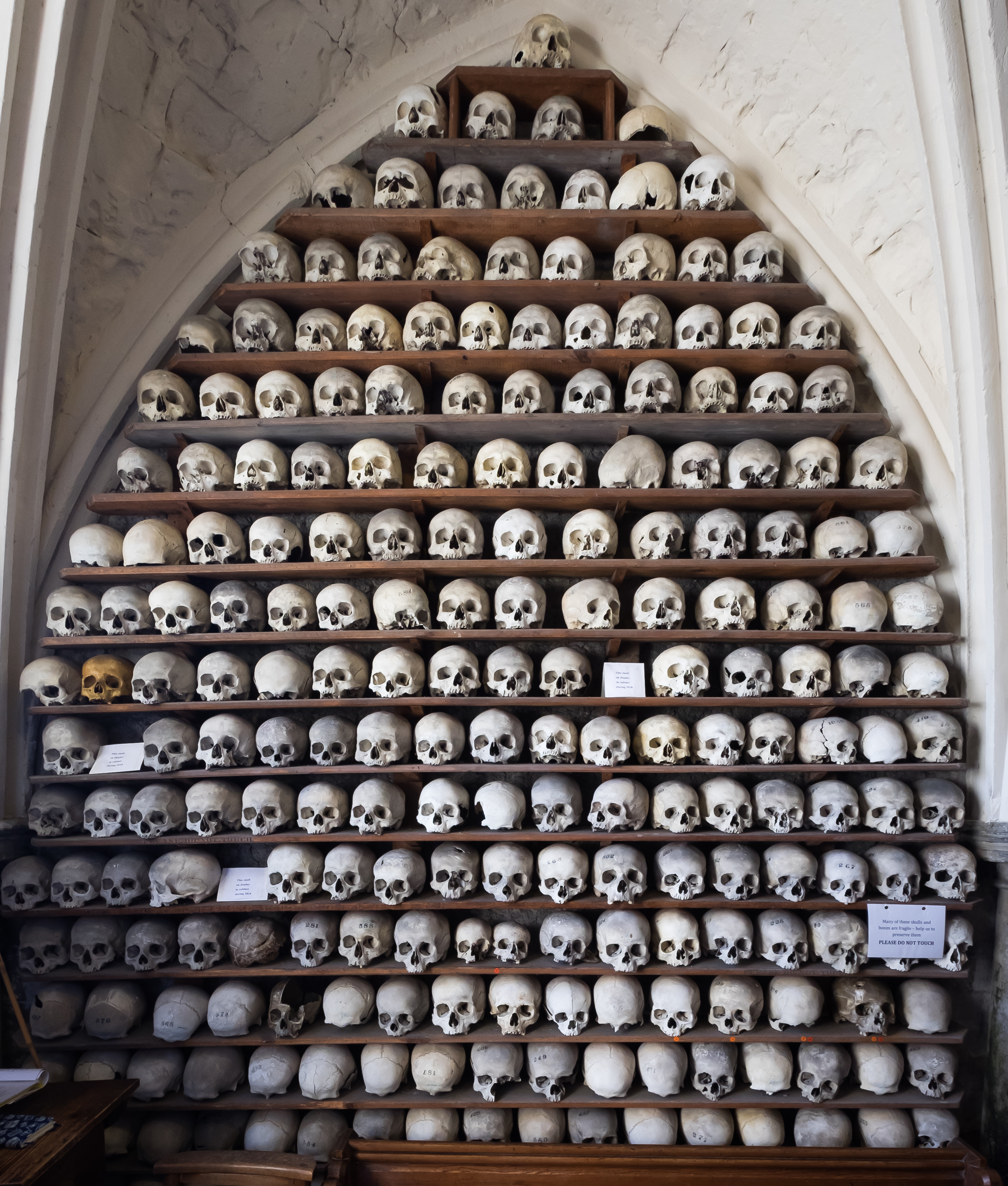
Skulls in the ossuary

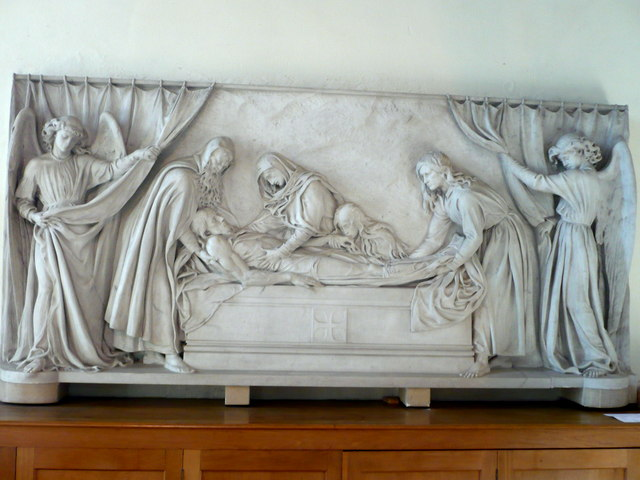
A memorial in the church

== See also ==
- Grade I listed buildings in Folkestone and Hythe
