= Elham Deanery =

The Elham Deanery is in the Diocese of Canterbury in Kent, England.

Churches within the Deanery:

Church Name	Location	Current Incumbent
St Martin	Acrise	Robert Grinsell
All Souls	Cheriton Street	David de Verney
St Martin	Cheriton	David de Verney
St Mary Magdalene	Denton	interregnum
St Mary the Virgin	Elham	interregnum
Holy Trinity	Folkestone	Rev Bob Weldon
St Augustine	Folkestone	David Adlington
St George	Folkestone	Rev Bob Weldon
St John the Baptist	Folkestone	interregnum
St Mary & St Eanswyth	Folkestone	David Adlington
St Peter	Folkestone	David Adlington
St Saviour	Folkestone	David Adlington
St Luke	Hawkinge	Robert Grinsell
St Leonard	Hythe	Tony Windross
St Mary & St Ethelburga	Lyminge	Peter Ashman
St Stephen	Lympne	Nicholas Cooper
St Nicholas	Newington	David de Verney
St Oswald	Paddlesworth	Peter Ashman
St Mary	Postling	Peter Ashman
St Peter & St Paul	Saltwood	Nicholas Cooper
St Paul	Sandgate	Rev Bob Weldon
All Saints	Stanford	Peter Ashman
St Martin	Wootton	interregnum
