= Northfleet (ship) =

Ship sunk in the Channel in 1873

Coordinates: 50.884°N 1.047°E

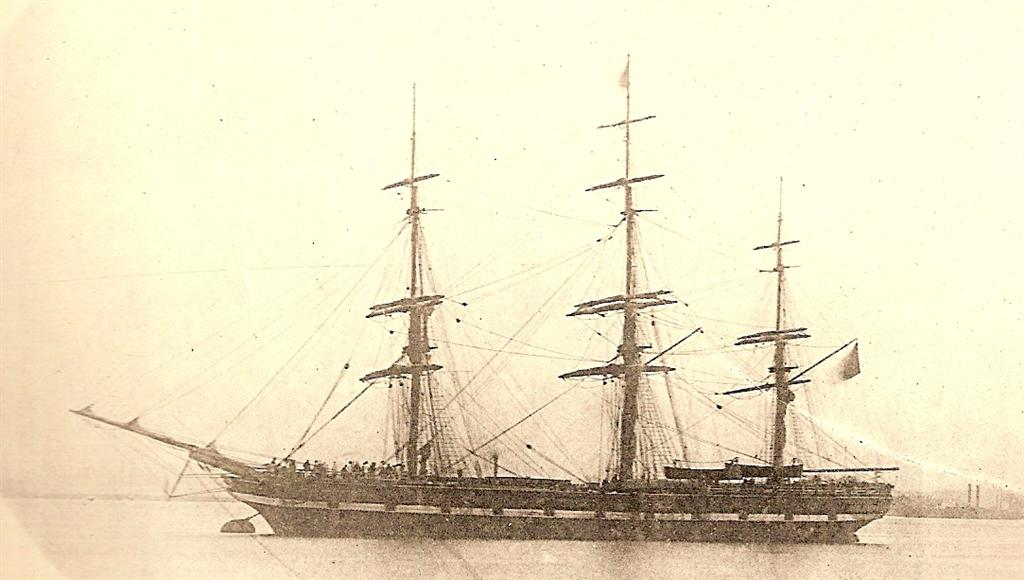
- The Northfleet photographed on the Thames a few days before her loss.

History
- Name: Northfleet
- Owner: Duncan Dunbar (1853-); John Patton, Jr., London (-1873)
- Builder: Northfleet, Kent
- Launched: 1853
- Fate: Sunk in a collision on 22 January 1873

General characteristics
- Tonnage: 951 GRT; 895 NRT
- Length: 180 feet (55 m) pp
- Beam: 32.3 feet (9.8 m)
- Depth of hold: 20 feet (6.1 m)
- Sail plan: Full-rigged ship

The Northfleet was a British full-rigged ship that is best remembered for her disastrous sinking in the English Channel in January 1873.

== Description ==
The Northfleet was a Blackwall Frigate of 951 tons gross, 895 net registered tons on dimensions of 180 feet (55 m) between perpendiculars, 32.3 feet (9.8 m) beam and 20.0 feet (6.1 m) depth of hold. She was built at Northfleet, Kent in 1853 for London shipowner Duncan Dunbar and spent much of her career trading between England and Australia and between England, India and China.

== Sinking ==
In 1872 the ship was owned by John Patton, Jr., of London when she was chartered to carry labourers and their families, 340 tons of iron rails, and 240 tons of other equipment to build a railway line in Tasmania, under the command of her previous chief officer Captain Edward Knowles (born on 4 May 1839).

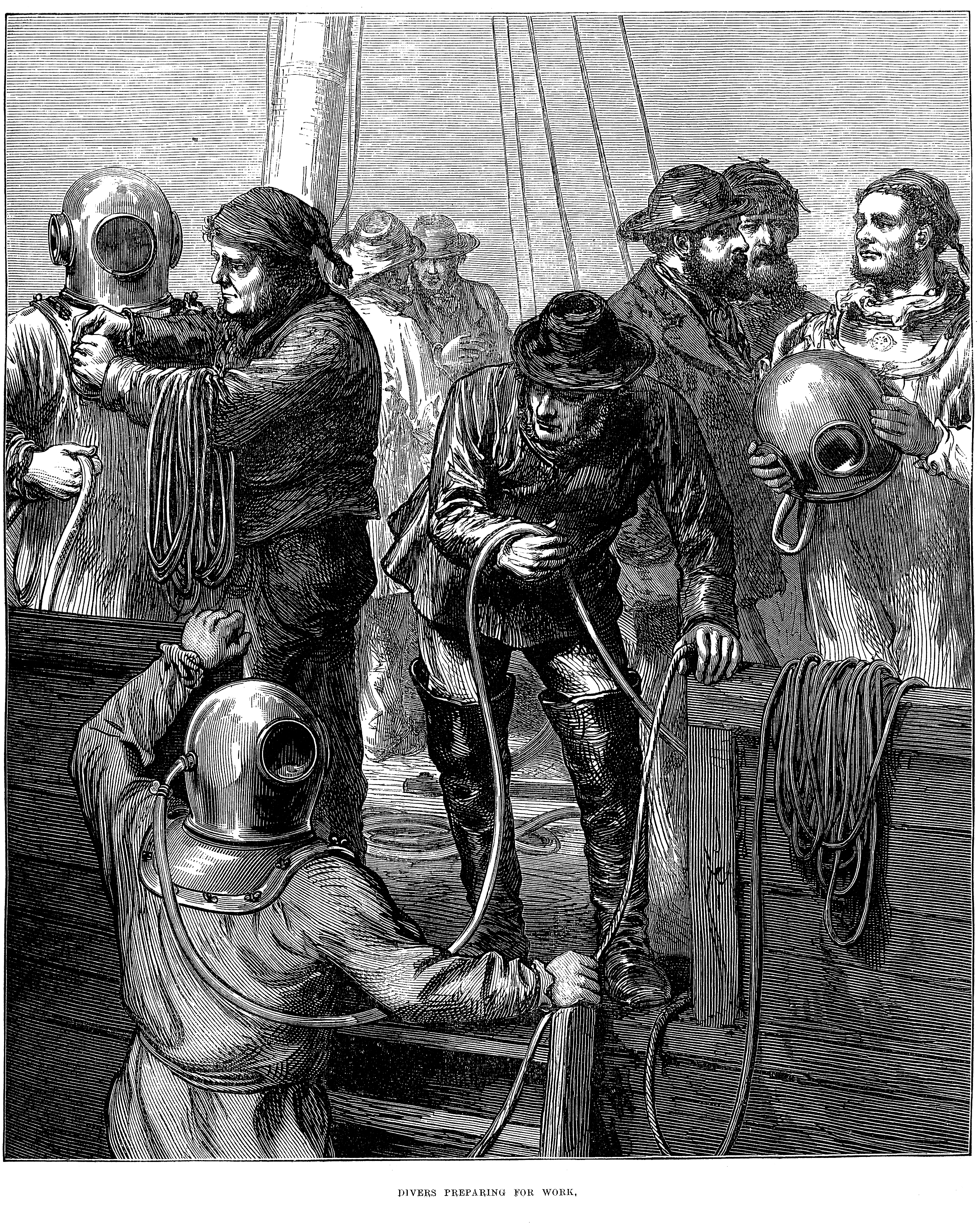
Divers preparing to recover bodies from the wreck, Illustrated London News, 6 February 1873

The Northfleet left Gravesend for Hobart on 13 January 1873 with 379 persons on board: the pilot, 34 crew, three cabin passengers and the assisted emigrants comprising 248 men, 42 women and 52 children. Bad weather forced the ship to drop anchor at several points before leaving the Channel and on the night of 22 January she was at anchor 2.75 mi (4.43 km) off Dungeness. Around 10.30 p.m. she was run down by a steamer that backed off and disappeared into the darkness. The heavily laden Northfleet sank within half an hour, before vessels in the vicinity realised anything was amiss, and in the ensuing panic a total of 293 people were drowned. 86 were saved. Of the women on board only the captain's wife and one emigrant survived, along with just two of the children. Only two boats managed to get clear of the sinking ship, one without any oars and the other damaged. The captain went down with his ship.

The offending steamer proved to be the Spanish steamship Murillo, which was stopped off Dover on 22 September 1873, eight months after the collision. A Court of Admiralty condemned her to be sold and severely censured her officers.

== Burials- ==
Six of the victims are buried in the curtailment of All Saints Church, Lydd.

== Inquest ==
An inquest was held at Lydd Guildhall in February 1873.

== Sources ==
- Basil Lubbock, The Blackwall Frigates, Brown, Son & Ferguson, Glasgow, 1924.
- Lloyd's Register of Shipping.
- The Loss of the Ship Northfleet, Waterlow and Sons, London, 1873
- Cassell’s Illustrated History of England (c.1885) v.10, pp. 40–42.
