= St Augustine's Church, Brookland =

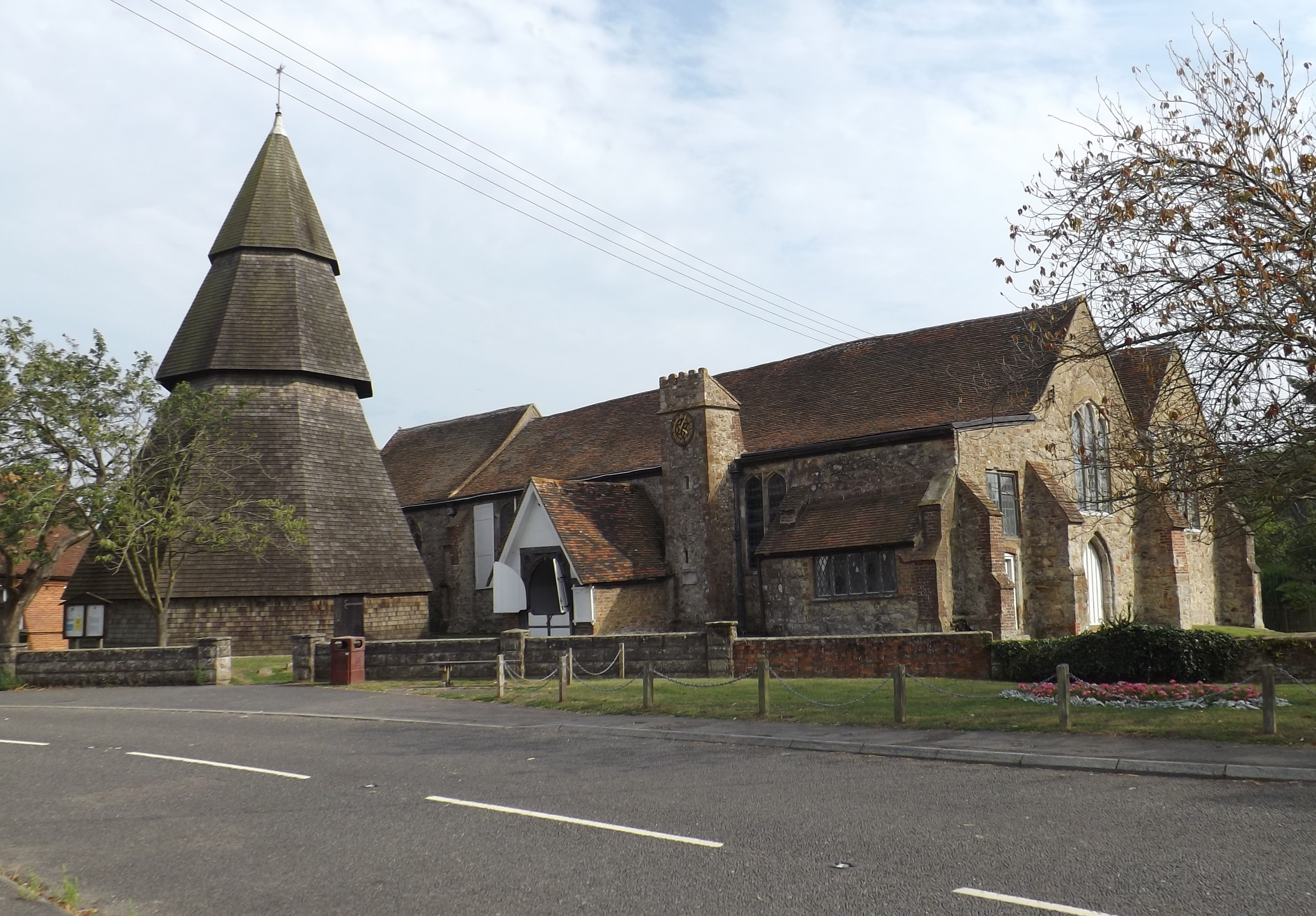
- St Augustine's Church, Brookland
- 50.9973°N 0.8339°E
- OS grid reference: TQ 989 258
- Location: Brookland, Kent
- Country: England
- Denomination: Church of England

History
- Dedication: Augustine of Canterbury

Architecture
- Heritage designation: Grade I
- Designated: 9 June 1959
- Completed: about 1250

Administration
- Diocese: Diocese of Canterbury
- Deanery: Romney Deanery

St Augustine's Church is a Grade I listed Anglican church in the village of Brookland, Kent, in Walland Marsh, about 5 miles (8.0 km) north-east of Rye, East Sussex. It was originally built about 1250. It has the unusual feature that the bell tower is separate from the rest of the church.

The church is dedicated to St Augustine, the first Archbishop of Canterbury.

== Exterior ==
The church was built about 1250; because of the likelihood of flooding it was built on an artificial mound. The bell tower was not incorporated in the church building, but is a separate structure near the north porch of the church. Originally it was a square framework without cladding; in the 15th century a new bell cage was fitted, and the structure was strengthened, extended into an octagon, and cladding added. The candle snuffer-shaped roof dates from this time. It was reclad in 1936, and again in 1990.

There are six bells, one of which was made about 1450. There were five bells until 1973, the other four dated 1685; in 1973 year two smaller bells were cast from the metal of a larger bell, and the set was rehung in a new frame.

The north porch, built in the 14th century, is of wood, and adjacent is a small tower with a clock.

== Interior ==
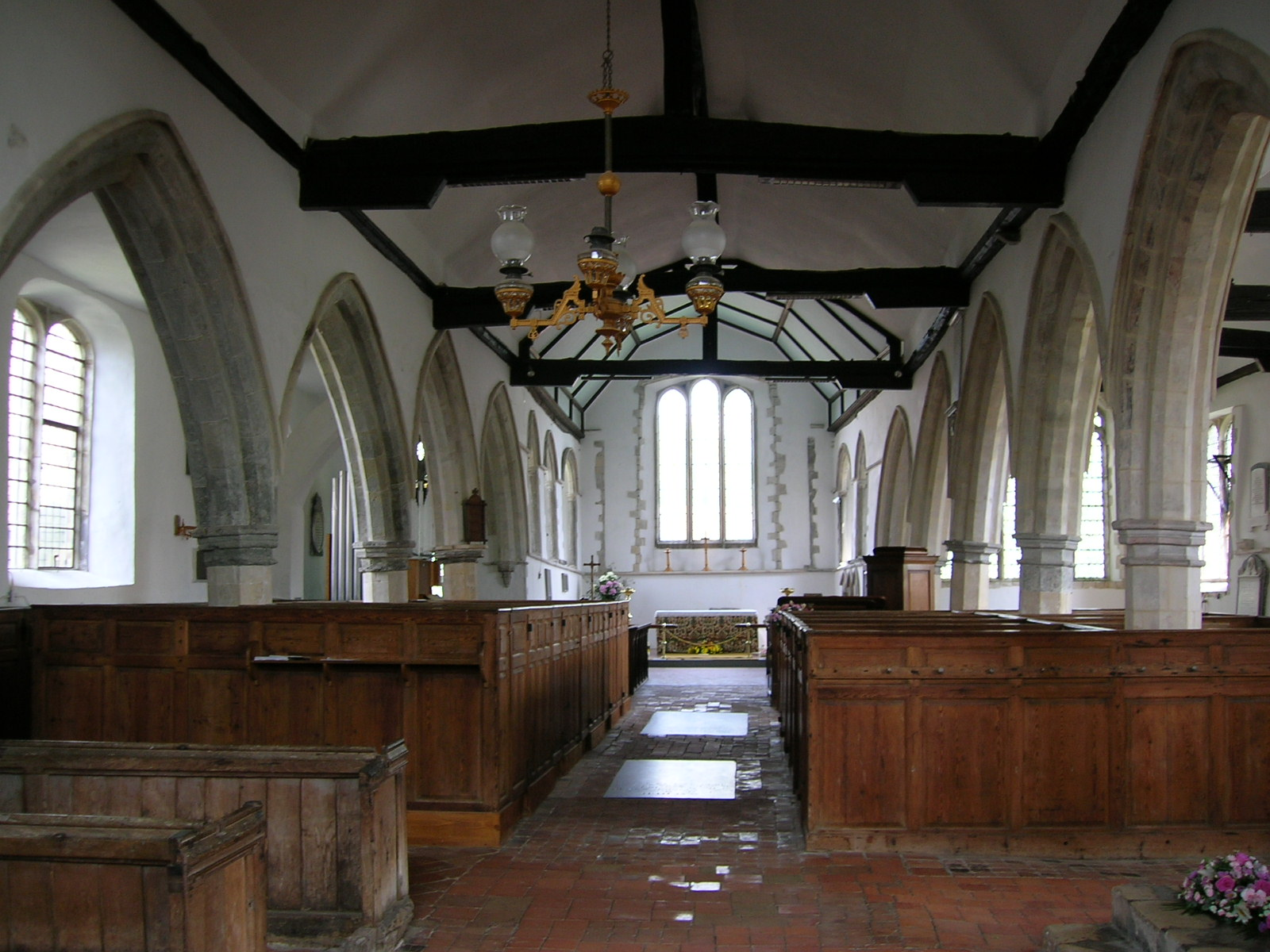
Inside the church, looking east

Inside, the nave and chancel are continuous, with no chancel arch, and there is a south aisle running the length of the church. The arcades have seven arches on the south side and six on the north side; the windows do not have stained glass. There are box pews, built around 1738.

On the east end of the south wall of the south chapel is the surviving part of a painting depicting the martyrdom of Thomas Becket in 1170; this was discovered in 1964, and is thought to have been painted in the second half of the 13th century.

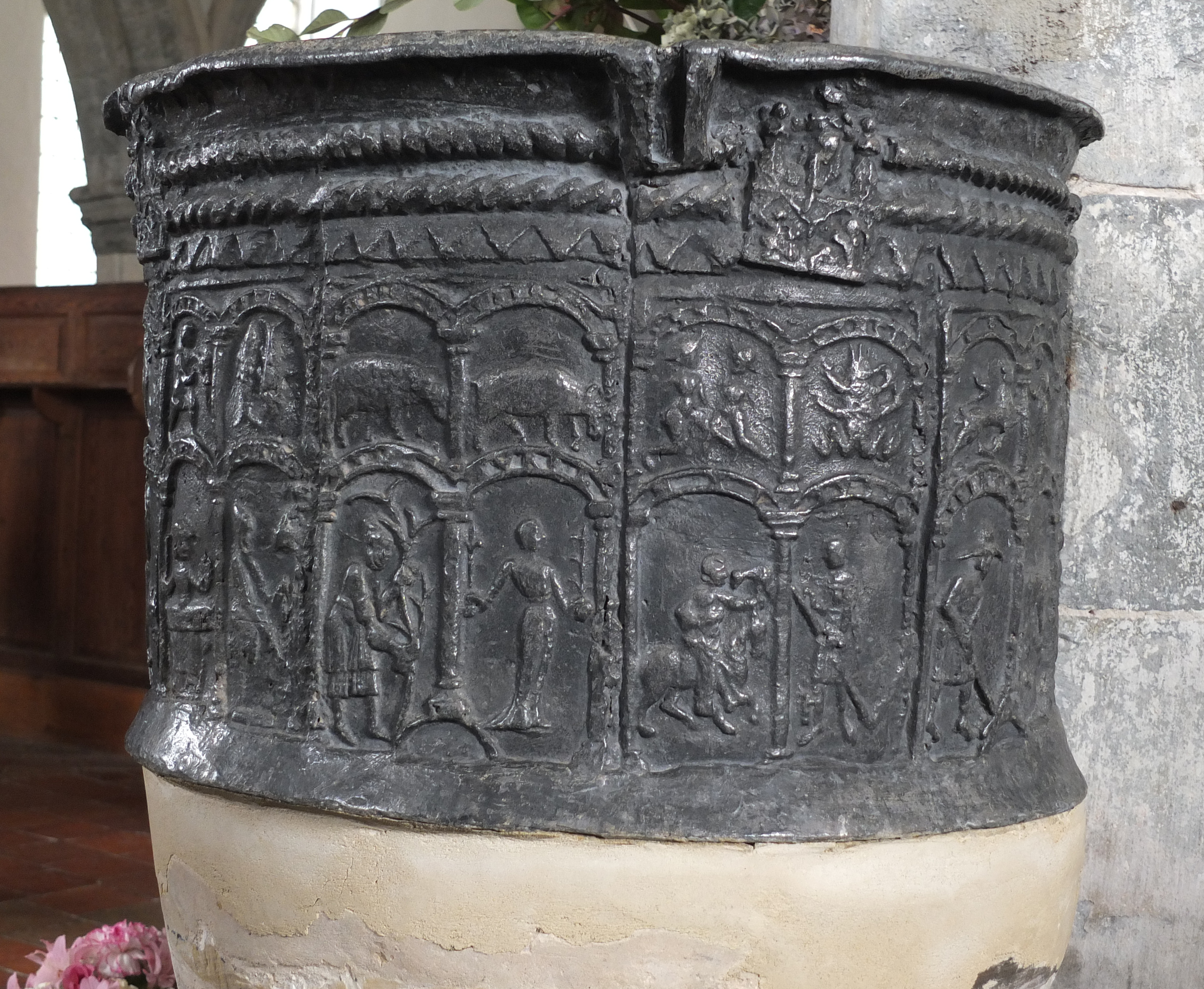
The font

The font, made around 1200, is circular and made of lead. There are two courses of decoration: the upper course shows the signs of the zodiac, and on the lower course are depicted the agricultural labours appropriate to each month of the year. On an arch above each labour, the month, in early French, is shown.

== The Saxon church ==
St Augustine is a Saxon saint, indicating that there was a church here in Saxon times. There is evidence that Brookland belonged to Edward of Coombe around the year 997; he gave the manor to St Augustine's Abbey in Canterbury, because his son was a monk there. It is probable that, as other churches built by the Abbey in dependent manors were dedicated to St Augustine, a church was built here between 997 and 1066 and similarly dedicated by the Abbey.

== See also ==
- Grade I listed buildings in Folkestone and Hythe
