= Ringlestone (suburb) =

Coordinates: 51.286837°N 0.51732°E

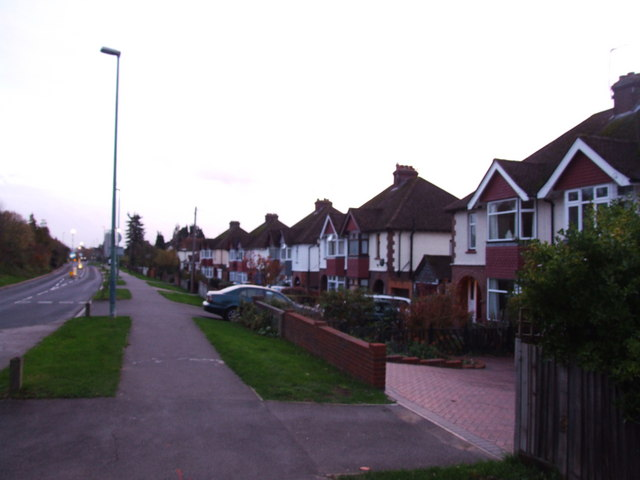

- Location within Kent
- Population: 9,481 (2011)
- Shire county: Kent
- Region: South East
- Country: England
- Sovereign state: United Kingdom
- Post town: Maidstone
- Postcode district: ME14
- Dialling code: 01622
- Police: Kent
- Fire: Kent
- Ambulance: South East Coast
- UK Parliament: Maidstone and Malling

Ringlestone is a suburb and housing estate in the town of Maidstone, Kent, England. It is on the eastern side of the River Medway, near Allington, 1.2 miles (2 km) north of Maidstone town centre.

The area was originally part of the estate surrounding Park House, owned by Edmund Law Lushington, professor of Greek and later Lord Rector of the University of Glasgow. His friend and brother-in-law, Lord Tennyson was a frequent visitor, and it is believed Tennyson's poems The Brook and The Princess were inspired by his visits.

The house was acquired in 1936 to the military to form Invicta Park Barracks, while some of the land was used for housing, which forms the eastern part of the estate today.

The estate has two small shops and an Esso petrol station. In July 2023 St Faith's Church moved to a new building in Ringlestone, on the site of an existing community centre, from its previous building in the town centre.
