= All Saints Church, Lydd =

Coordinates: 50.95180°N 0.90689°E

All Saints' Church
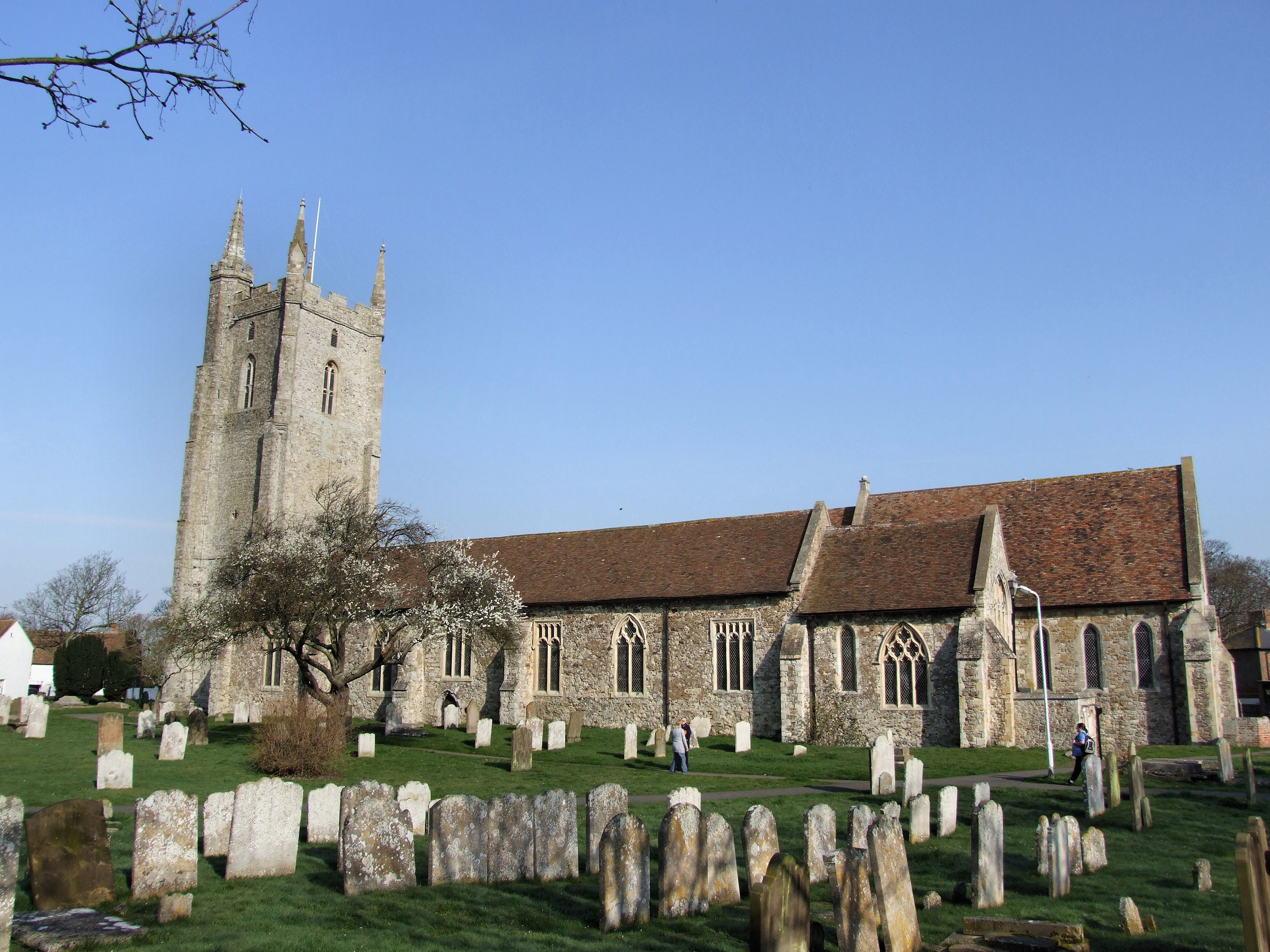
- All Saints' Church

- Location in Kent
- OS grid reference: TR 04271 20953
- Location: Lydd, Kent
- Country: England
- Denomination: Church of England

History
- Status: Parish church
- Founded: Fifth century
- Dedication: All Saints

Architecture
- Functional status: Active
- Heritage designation: Grade I
- Designated: 28 November 1950
- Architectural type: Church

Administration
- Province: Province of Canterbury
- Diocese: Diocese of Canterbury
- Archdeaconry: Ashford
- Deanery: Romney and Tenterden
- Parish: Lydd

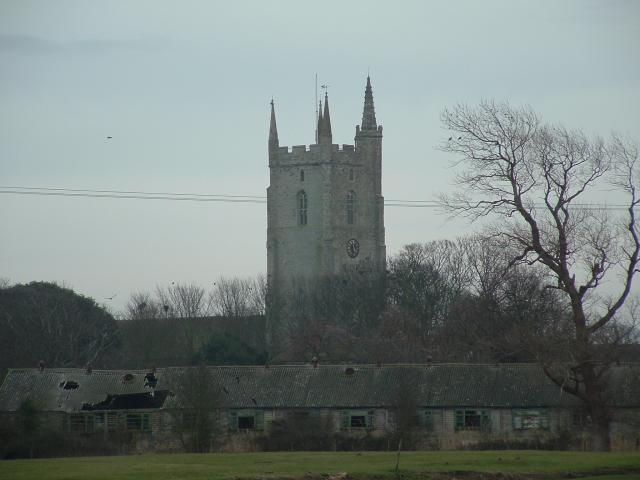

All Saints' Church, also known as Lydd Church or The Cathedral on the Marsh, is a church in Lydd, Kent, South East England. It belongs to the Diocese of Canterbury. All Saints is the longest parish church in Kent at 199 feet (61 m), and also has one of the tallest towers in the county at 132 feet (40 m). The church is thought to incorporate a small Romano-British basilica possibly built in the fifth century, though most of the current fabric is medieval. It was associated with local fraternities or guilds in the fifteenth century and could seat 1,000 people at a time. Severely damaged by World War II bombing, the church was subsequently restored and is now a Grade I listed building.

== History ==
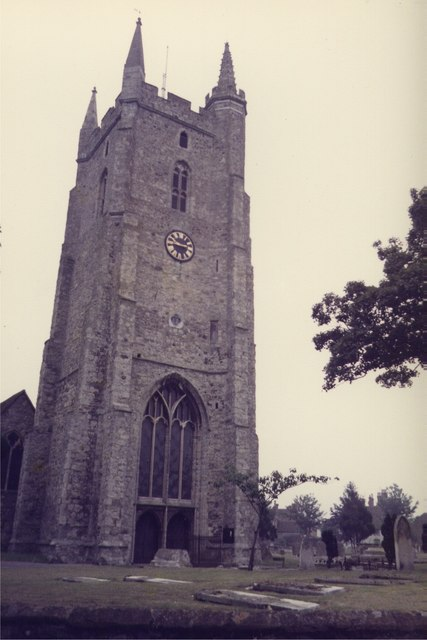
Church tower

The church was long thought to be Saxon in origin, but recent studies have dated the oldest section to the latter half of the 5th century, making it Romano-British. It appears to incorporate a very small basilica which had an apse, an arcade on the north side of three bays, and an elaborate porch on the west side. This is considerably different from Anglo-Saxon churches, leading to a Romano-British attribution.

In the fifteenth century, a number of fraternities or guilds of lay parishioners were connected with the church. Each of these fraternities held services in a different part of the church, either at a special altar of its patron saint, or before the image of that saint; and each fraternity maintained a light before the altar, or image of its patron. In the fifteenth century, the fraternities were those of the Holy Trinity, All Saints, St James, St Peter, St Mary, St Katherine, St John the Baptist, and St George. In the following century, St Barbara, St Anthony, St Mildred, and St Nicholas were added. The church registers for christenings and marriages began in 1542 and for burials in 1539.

The church interior was restored in the eighteenth century when box pews were replaced with oak pews to give a seating capacity of 1,000. The church was extensively damaged during the Second World War, with the chancel destroyed by a stray bomb in 1940. It was re-built after the war in the Early English style, which removed the Victorian "restoration" of the east end. Rectors included Thomas Wolsey (later Cardinal), though it is doubtful that he ever attended, as he held a number of churches in plurality, employing a curate and keeping the tithes for himself.

The church became a Grade I listed building in 1950.

== Architecture and fittings ==
All Saints is the longest parish church in Kent at 199 feet (61 m). The stone church is built in three styles, Early English, Decorated, and Perpendicular. The church, built of ragstone rubble with a tiled roof, received pews and a new roof over the nave during the reigns of Edward IV and Richard III. The west tower, at 132 feet, is one of the tallest in Kent, with a fine peal of eight bells, recast in 1926 from an earlier, 17th century peal of five. This tower is dated to between 1435 and 1450 and is crenellated with 4 crockets. The roof of the nave contains moulded and battlemented tie-beams, ornamental bracket-shaped wall-pieces, moulded wall plates, and octagonal king posts.

There was a chapel dedicated to St Mary, an altar and a chapel of St. John the Baptist, in one of the side chancels; there were altars dedicated to St Peter, the Holy Trinity, and St James. A window depicting the Seven Sacraments was bequeathed in 1476 by John Seawlys.

A collection of 17 monumental brasses are commonly kept from view beneath the nave carpet. Within the church, the ancient family of Godfrey of Lydd are represented by a brass in the thirteenth-century nave which has the date 1430 upon it, and a bust set in the north wall of the chancel. Descendants of this family are to be found on World War I and II memorials. The church was adorned with paintings, and writings provided by churchwarden John Marketman in 1611. Around 1428, new organs were purchased, which were repaired 26 years later. The church contains a sixteenth-century memorial to Thomas Godfrey and an effigy of Sir Walter de Meryl, Lord of the Manor of Jacques Court. Also of note is a roundel carved in marble by John Flaxman, dedicated to Anne Russell and her son.

== Grounds ==
The earliest existing tomb in the churchyard belongs to the Strugell family and dates from 1551. From Leland Duncan's Monumental Inscriptions in the Churchyard and Church of All Saints, Lydd, Kent (1927), it is evident that a large number of sailors are buried in the churchyard, victims of the stormy seas along this dangerous coast. They include six drowned in the wreck of the "Northfleet" in January 1873; and Tom Edgar, who sailed on the third voyage of James Cook in 1776–1780. The tower overlooks an old holm oak, on top of which rest heron nests.
