= St Clement's Church, Old Romney =

Church of St Clement, Old Romney
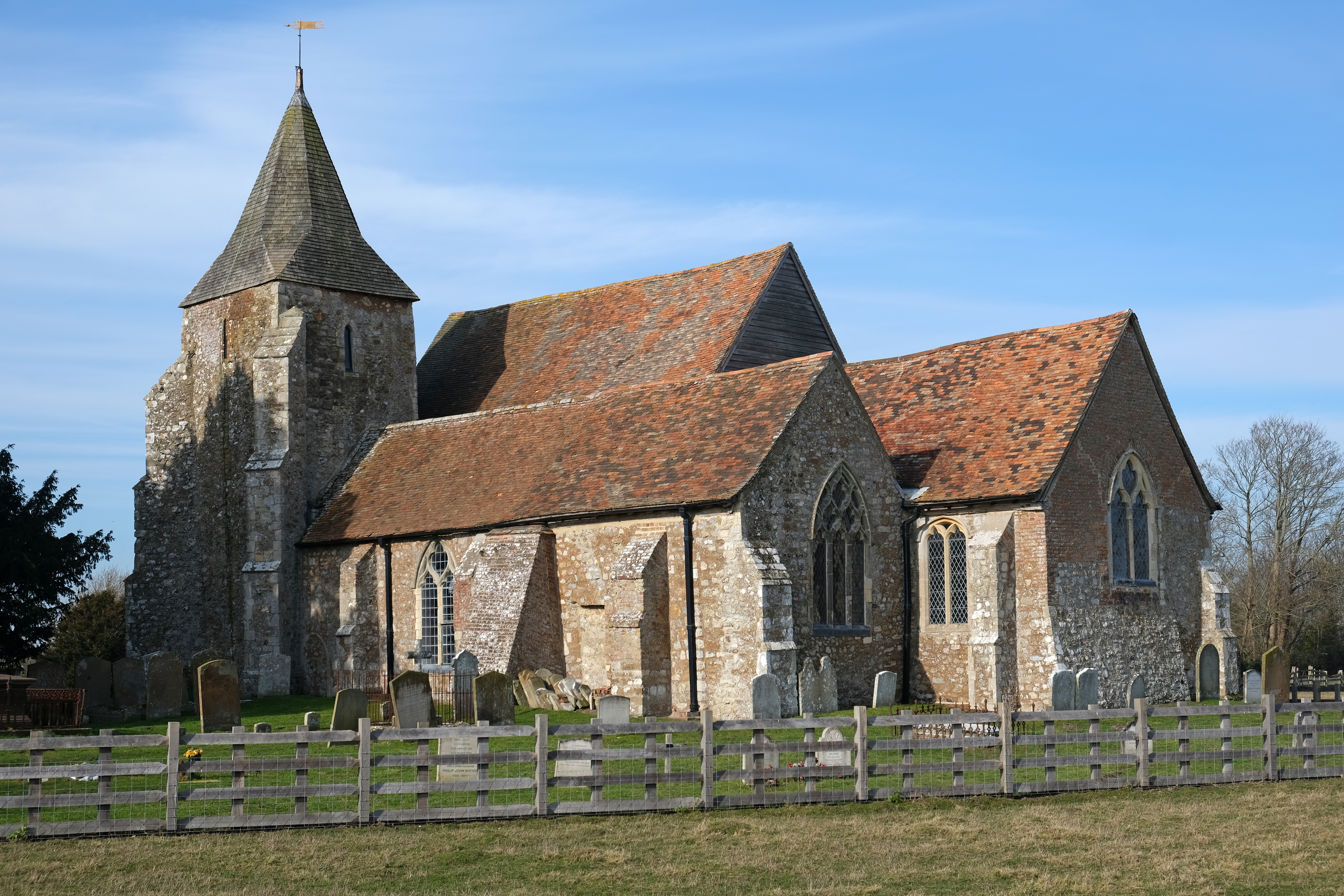
- Church of St Clement, Old Romney
- 50°59′24″N 0°53′54″E
- OS grid reference: TR 035 252
- Location: Old Romney, Kent
- Country: England
- Denomination: Church of England
- Website: https://romneychurches.org/st-clement-old-romney

History
- Dedication: Saint Clement

Architecture
- Heritage designation: Grade I
- Designated: 9 June 1959

Administration
- Diocese: Diocese of Canterbury
- Deanery: Romney and Tenterden

St Clement's Church is an Anglican church, in the village of Old Romney, Kent, England. It is a Grade I listed building.

The church is dedicated to Saint Clement, a successor to Saint Peter at Rome. It is built on an artificial mound to protect it from floodwater. It is thought the original church was built in the 8th century.

In the 11th or 12th century the Saxon church was replaced by an early Norman church, aisleless and with a square-ended chancel. It was enlarged in the 13th century. The present building, mostly of the 13th century, has a nave and chancel, and there are north and south chapels. There is a small tower, with south-east and south-west buttresses, in the south-west corner, and a north porch.

== Interior ==
The box pews in the nave are of the 18th century. At the west end is a gallery, of late 18th century, supported by four Doric columns. There are Georgian wooden panels showing texts, on the walls of the nave.

The font, in the south-west, is of the Decorated period, about 1300. It is square, and is supported by a central octagonal pillar; at each corner is a column with a carved capital.

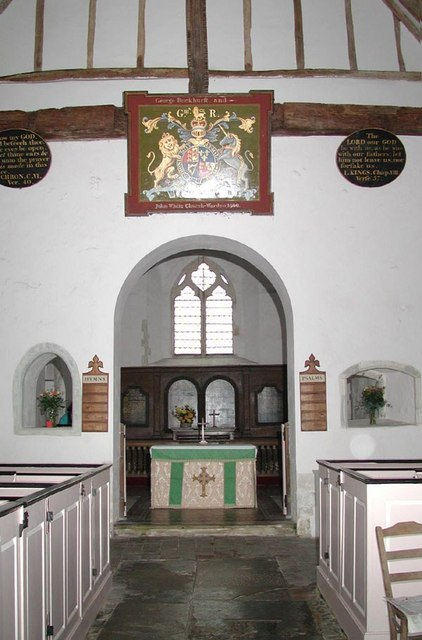
Looking towards the chancel, showing the Royal Arms and the hagioscopes on either side of the chancel arch.

In the chancel of the north chapel is a medieval altar stone, or mensa. This was found, during the renovation of the late 1960s, in the ground outside the church near the porch, and was originally thought to be a memorial slab.

=== Chancel ===
Over the chancel arch is the Royal Arms of England, of 1800 (including the Fleur-de-lys, omitted in later Royal Arms).

The altar rails are of the early 18th century. There are 17th-century wooden panels behind the altar showing the Lord's Prayer, the Creed and the Commandments.

A stone slab to the memory of John Deffray is in the middle of the chancel floor. Deffray, a Huguenot, born in France in 1661, was Rector of St Clements from 1690 to his death in 1738. The slab bears his French coat of arms.

== Renovation ==
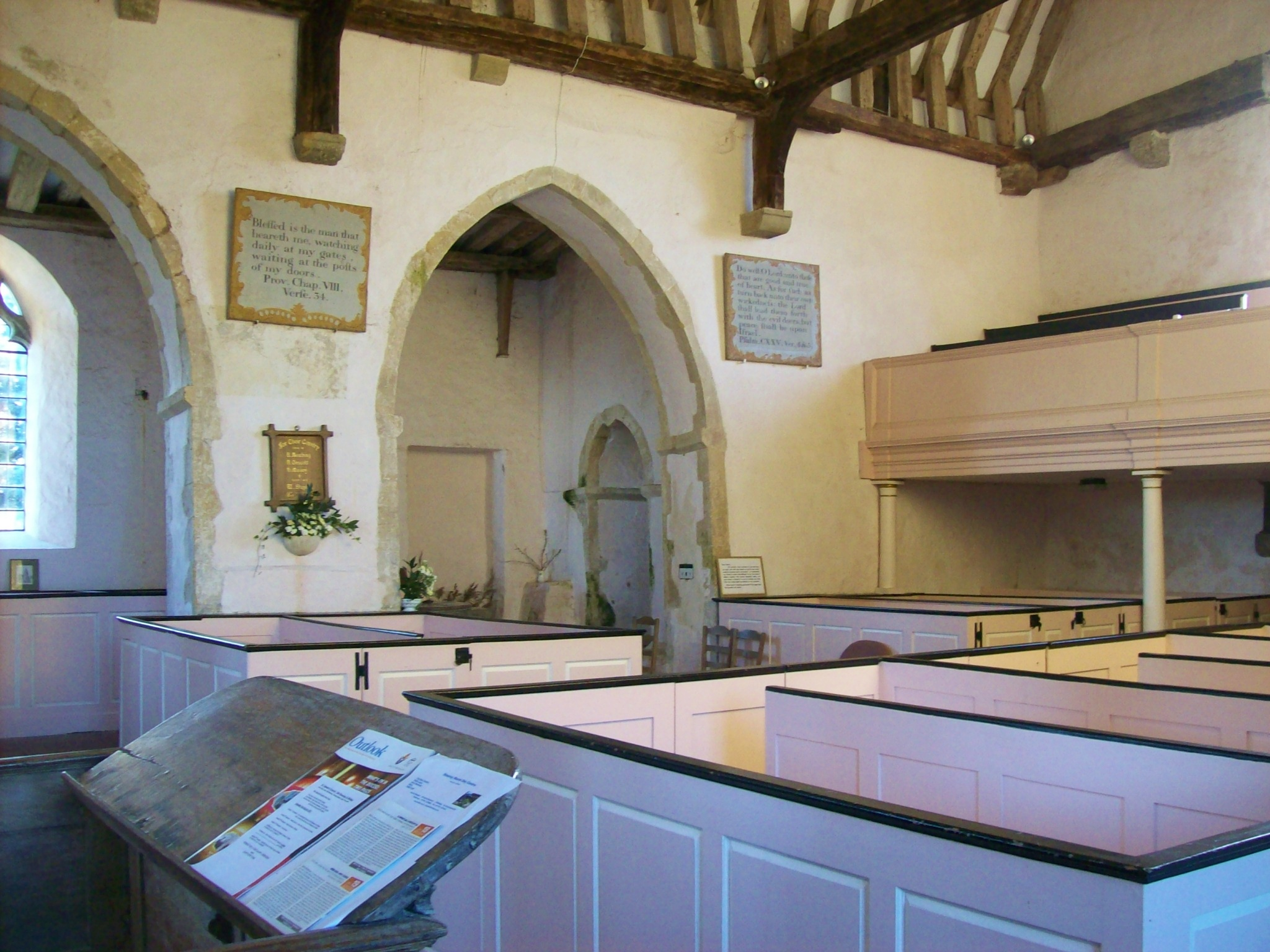
Nave, looking south-west, showing the gallery and the south chapel.

In 1929 the panelling round the chancel arch, of about 1788, was removed; this revealed a rood staircase doorway, and two hagioscopes between nave and chancel. The plaster ceiling of the chancel was removed, revealing the rafters.

In 1959 there was renovation by Anthony Swaine, a Canterbury architect. The east face of the tower was rebuilt and some timber was replaced. The roof over the nave and south aisle was repaired. Renovation ceased when the money available was exhausted.

The church was used for location scenes in the film Dr Syn, Alias the Scarecrow (1963); for this the film company repainted the box pews and the gallery, and repaired the stairway to the gallery. The film company left money for further repairs to be done, and, also supported by other grants, renovation was continued; it was completed in 1968.

== Churchyard ==
The grave of the film-maker Derek Jarman (1942–1994) is in the churchyard.
