= Swingfield =

Village in Kent, England

Coordinates: 51.1464°N 1.18972°E

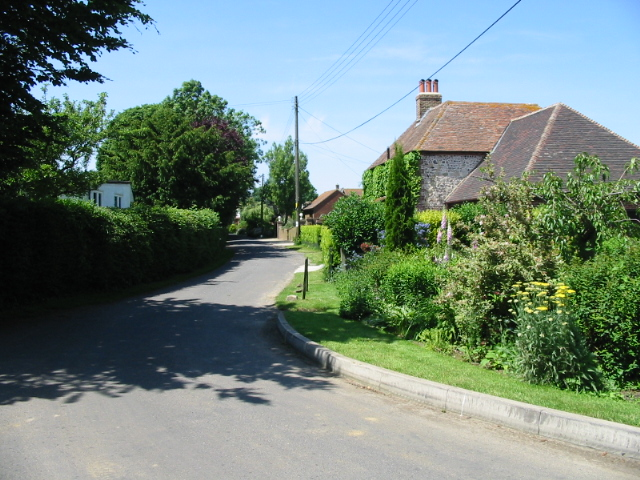
- A street of Swingfield

- Location within Kent
- Population: 1,227 (2011)
- District: Folkestone and Hythe
- Shire county: Kent
- Region: South East
- Country: England
- Sovereign state: United Kingdom
- Post town: Dover
- Postcode district: CT15
- Police: Kent
- Fire: Kent
- Ambulance: South East Coast
- UK Parliament: Folkestone and Hythe

Swingfield is a village and civil parish in the district of Folkestone and Hythe in Kent, England. The parish includes the settlements of Densole on the A260 towards Hawkinge, and Selsted.

The village is located approximately 5 miles north of Folkestone on the North Downs. Notable buildings include St Peter's Church and Swingfield Preceptory.

== History ==
The place-name 'Swingfield' is first attested in 1202 in the Curia Regis Rolls, and in 1242 in the Book of Fees, in both instances appearing as Swinesfeld. The name means "pigs' field or open land". The tower of St Peter's Church was a measuring point for the Anglo-French Survey (1784–1790) linking the Royal Greenwich Observatory and the Paris Observatory.

== Amenities ==
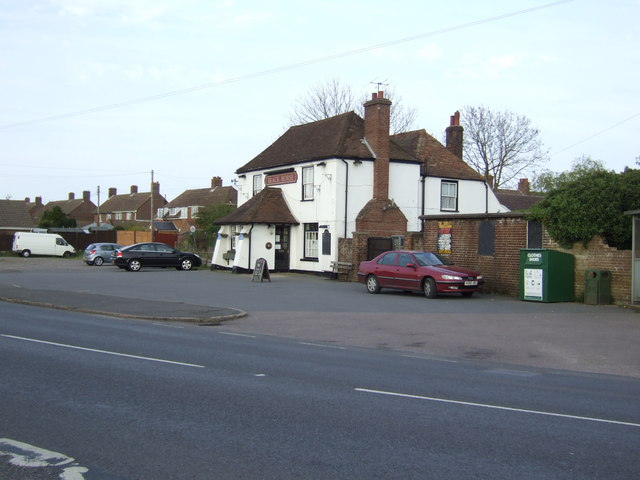

Densole has the Black Horse pub, a butterfly centre and camp sites. Also nearby is Reinden Woods, an important habitat for woodland plants and butterflies which is part of the Army's East Kent Dry Training Area.

There is a primary school at Selsted.
