= Paddlesworth =

Hamlet in Kent, England

Coordinates: 51.115°N 1.137°E

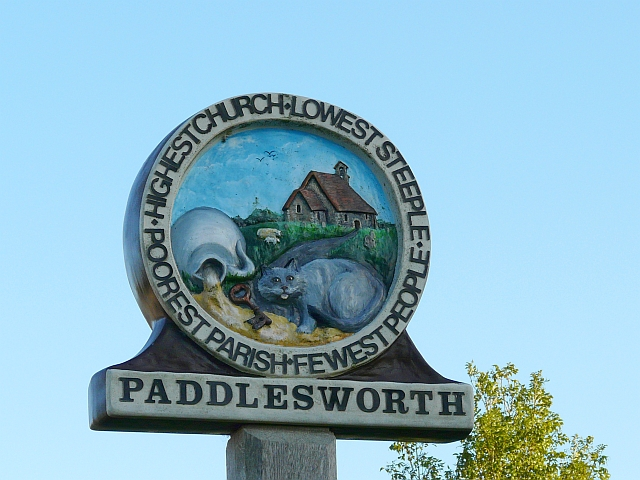
- Village sign, showing St Oswald's Church and a cat and a custard pot

- Location within Kent
- Population: 38 (parish, 2001 Census)
- OS grid reference: TR197398
- District: Folkestone and Hythe
- Shire county: Kent
- Region: South East
- Country: England
- Sovereign state: United Kingdom
- Post town: Folkestone
- Postcode district: CT18
- Police: Kent
- Fire: Kent
- Ambulance: South East Coast
- UK Parliament: Folkestone and Hythe

Paddlesworth is a hamlet and parish located about 3 miles (4.8 km) NNW of Folkestone in Kent, England, near Hawkinge.

Paddlesworth was a sighting-point for the Anglo-French Survey (1784–1790) linking the Royal Greenwich Observatory with the Paris Observatory, undertaken by General William Roy. A chain of readings was made from high points between the two observatories, including locally from Dover Castle, St Peter's Church, Swingfield, and Aldington Knoll.

The Early Norman Anglican parish church is dedicated to St Oswald. It was built in the 11th century or earlier but underwent alteration in the 13th and restoration in the 19th century. It has been designated as a Grade I listed building.

It is said of Paddlesworth that it has the "Highest Church, Lowest Steeple, Poorest Parish, Fewest People". These words can be seen carved in a circle round the edge of the village sign, as seen in the photo above right.

The public house is 'The Cat and Custard Pot', two elements illustrated on the village sign.

From September to December 2010 a group of writers and artists created the Paddlesworth Press, a "mixed-media, collaborative online novel" based on Paddlesworth with fictional characters and events in a spoof newspaper.
