= St Peter's Church, Swingfield =

Coordinates: 51.1465°N 1.1910°E

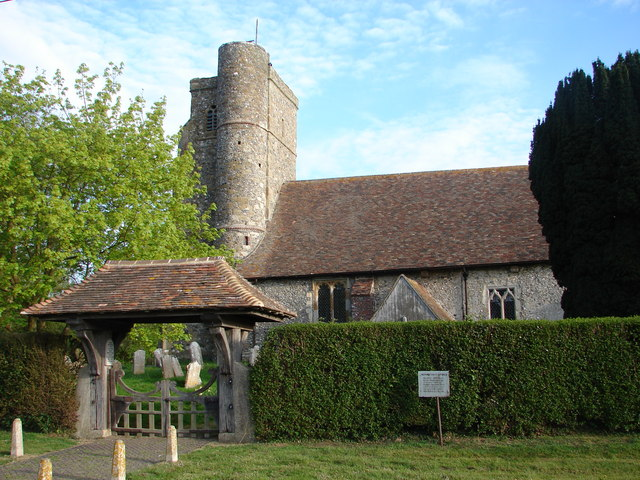
- St Peter's Church, Swingfield, from the south

- Location in Kent
- OS grid reference: TR 233 434
- Location: Swingfield, Kent
- Country: England
- Denomination: Anglican
- Website: Churches Conservation Trust

History
- Status: Former parish church
- Dedication: Saint Peter

Architecture
- Functional status: Redundant
- Heritage designation: Grade I
- Designated: 29 December 1966
- Architectural type: Church
- Style: Gothic

Specifications
- Materials: Flint with stone dressings Tiled and slated roofs

St Peter's Church is a redundant Anglican church in the village of Swingfield, some 3 miles (5 km) northeast of Hawkinge, Kent, England. It is recorded in the National Heritage List for England as a designated Grade I listed building, and is under the care of the Churches Conservation Trust.

== History ==
St Peter's dates mainly from the 13th century, with fabric possibly from the 11th or 12th century. Alterations were made in the 15th century, and the church was restored in 1870. It was declared redundant on 1 August 2000, and vested in the Churches Conservation Trust in 2011. The church has connections with the Knights Hospitaller, the former chapel of a commandery being located close to the village.

Swingfield church was part of a chain of measuring points for the trigonometric survey linking the Royal Greenwich Observatory and the Paris Observatory in the late eighteenth century. This Anglo-French Survey was led by General William Roy, and used cross-channel sightings from nearby Dover Castle and Fairlight Down on the South Downs.

== Architecture ==
The church is constructed in knapped flint with stone dressings. The roofs of the body of the church are tiled, and the tower roof is slated. Its plan consists of a nave with a north aisle and a south porch, a slightly narrower chancel, and a west tower. The tower dates from the 13th century, or from the late 15th century. It is in three stages, standing on a stone plinth. It has angle buttresses, a plain parapet, and a pyramidal roof with a weathervane. On the west side of the tower in the bottom stage is a low doorway, above which is a small rectangular window, with a small lancet window between them. The bell openings have two lights, with a sexfoil (six-lobed window) above them. To the southeast of the tower is a circular stair turret, rising to a greater height than the tower, with slit windows and a plain parapet. Close to the porch are two mass dials (sundials).

Inside the church is a four-bay arcade carried on alternate circular and octagonal piers. There are two aumbries, one in the north wall, the other in the south wall. The font is octagonal. It dates from the 14th century, and was restored to the church in 1914, having been found in a garden. The stained glass in the west window and in a south window dates from the 20th century. In the 17th century the church had a ring of three bells. Two of these were sold towards the end of the 18th century. The remaining bell was cast in 1696 by John Wood.

== External features ==
In the churchyard is an 18th-century monument that has been listed at Grade II.

== See also ==
- List of churches preserved by the Churches Conservation Trust in South East England
