= List of churches preserved by the Churches Conservation Trust in Southeast England =

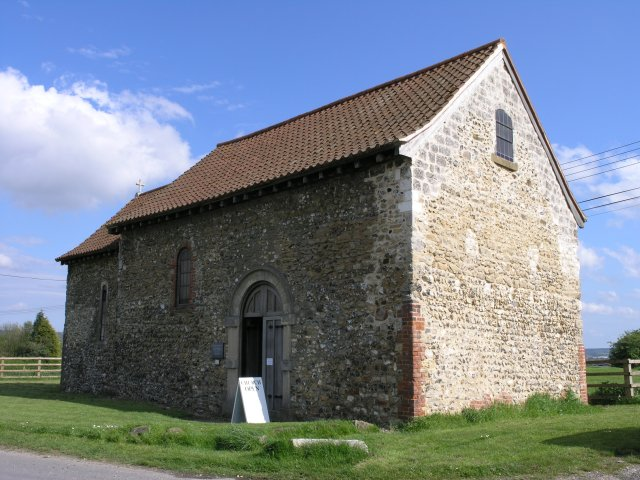
St Benedict's Church, Paddlesworth

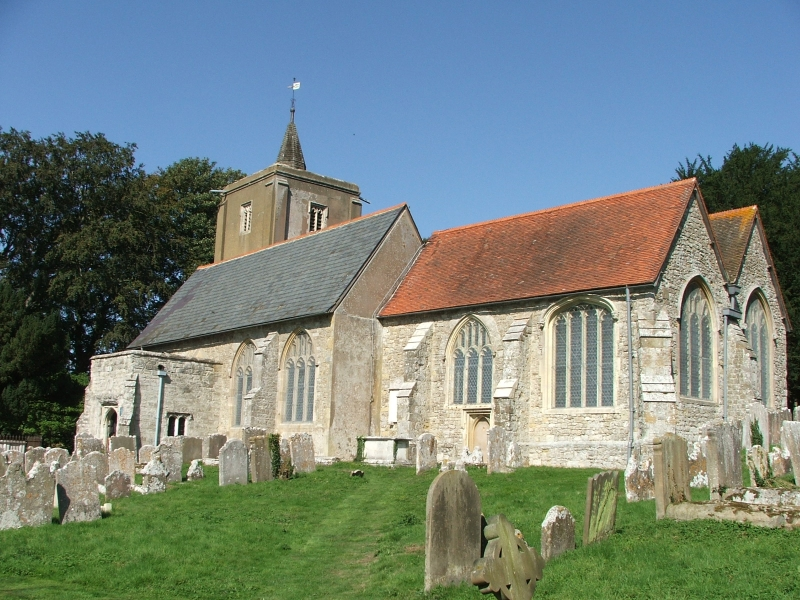
St Michael's Church, East Peckham

The Churches Conservation Trust, which was initially known as the Redundant Churches Fund, is a charity whose purpose is to protect historic churches at risk, those that have been made redundant by the Church of England. The Trust was established by the Pastoral Measure of 1968. The legally defined object of the Trust is "the preservation, in the interests of the nation and the Church of England, of churches and parts of churches of historic and archaeological interest or architectural quality vested in the Fund ... together with their contents so vested". The charity cares for over 350 churches. The Trust is financed partly by the Department for Culture, Media and Sport and the Church Commissioners, but grants from those bodies were frozen in 2001, since when additional funding has come from other sources, including the general public. In the 12 months ending 31 March 2010 the charity's income was £6,161,653, and its spending was £6,035,871. During that year it had 44 employees, and used the services of 2,000 volunteers. The charity is run by a board of trustees, who delegate the day-to-day management to a chief executive and his senior management team.

The Trust's primary aim is to ensure that the buildings in its care are weatherproof and to prevent any deterioration in their condition. The majority of the churches remain consecrated, and many are occasionally still used for worship. Local communities are encouraged to use them for appropriate activities and events, and the buildings provide an educational resource, allowing children and young people to study history and architecture. Nearly 2 million people visit the Trust's churches each year. As most of the churches remain consecrated, they are used for occasional services where this is practical, and some are venues for concerts and other purposes.

This list contains the 56 churches preserved by the Churches Conservation Trust in Southeast England, consisting of those in the counties of Oxfordshire, Buckinghamshire, Greater London, Berkshire, Hampshire, Surrey, Kent, West Sussex, and East Sussex. The churches range in age from the Anglo-Saxon All Saints Church, West Stourmouth, to the newest church in the list, Holy Trinity Church, Privett, which was built between 1876 and 1878. All the churches are designated by English Heritage as listed buildings, most of them in Grades I and II*.

== Key ==
Explanation of the three listed building grades
| Grade | Criteria |
|---|---|
| I | Buildings of exceptional interest, sometimes considered to be internationally important |
| II* | Particularly important buildings of more than special interest |
| II | Buildings of national importance and special interest |

== Churches ==
List of the churches, locations, date of construction, and listed building grade.
| Name and town or village | County and coordinates | Photograph | Date^{[A]} | Notes | Grade |
|---|---|---|---|---|---|
| St Botolph Botolphs | West Sussex; 50.8722°N 0.3062°W | A stone tower with a pyramidal roof and a central buttress, and the body of the church extending beyond it | Anglo-Saxon | The nave and chancel are Saxon, and the south doorway dates from the 17th century. A north aisle was added in about 1250, but this was demolished in the early 19th century. Around the chancel arch are traces of medieval wall paintings. | I |
| All Saints West Stourmouth | Kent; 51.3203°N 1.2365°E | A flint church with a red tied roof and a tower at the west end, seen from the southeast | Anglo-Saxon | The oldest fabric in the church is Anglo-Saxon. The church was altered in the 12th century, but following earthquake damage in 1382 it was rebuilt. Windows were replaced in the 14th and 15th centuries, and the church was restored in 1845. It has been redundant since 1979. The base of a rood screen is still present inside the church. | I |
| St Peter and St Paul (old) Albury | Surrey; 51.2200°N 0.4790°W | A stone church seen from the south, showing a transept with a large window, and a tower surmounted by a cupola | 11th century | The nave may date from the Anglo-Saxon era, and the lower part of the tower contains pre-Conquest masonry. The nave was extended in the 12th century, the chancel and south transept were added in the 13th century, followed by the south aisle in the following century. During the 19th century the Albury Park estate, in which the church stands, was owned by the banker Henry Drummond. He replaced the spire on the tower with a cupola, and commissioned A. W. N. Pugin to convert the south transept into a mortuary chapel. | I |
| St Thomas East Shefford | Berkshire; 51.4698°N 1.4391°W | A small simple church, largely rendered with a tiled roof, a brick porch, and a bellcote at the west end | 11th century | Norman features in the church include a north window, the font, and a piscina. Also in the church is the alabaster tomb of Sir Thomas Fettiplace, who died in 1447, and his wife, Lady Beatrice, who was a member of the Portuguese royal family. On the walls above the chancel arch are 12th-century paintings and painted texts. Worship ceased in the church in 1870, and its congregation transferred to a new church nearby. | I |
| St Mary Higham | Kent; 51.4409°N 0.4683°E | A stone church with red tiled roofs, showing the nave and aisle beside each other, a small spire, and the south porch | 11th century | The church is constructed in flint and ragstone, the flint arranged to give the appearance of horizontal stripes. The south aisle is almost as wide as the nave, and it is thought that this was added in the 14th century by a nunnery sited nearby at that time. The font is Norman, and between the nave and the Lady chapel is a 15th-century rood screen. | I |
| All Saints Little Somborne | Hampshire; 51.0919°N 1.4557°W | A small plain church with a bellcote | 11th century | All Saints has a simple plan, consisting of a nave and a chancel in a single range. The church incorporates an Anglo-Saxon pilaster strip and a Norman round-headed doorway. In the churchyard is the grave of Thomas Sopwith, the pioneer aviator. | II* |
| St Mary the Virgin North Stoke | West Sussex; 50.8874°N 0.5514°W | Two parts of a church at right-angles to each other, one rendered, one flint, both tiled | 11th century | The ancient dedication of the church to Saint Mary the Virgin was rediscovered in 2007 by two amateur archaeologists. The church has a cruciform plan with a nave, chancel and two transepts. It contains windows in six different architectural styles. The oldest fitting is a 13th-century font. | I |
| St Mary Sandwich | Kent; 51.2772°N 1.3387°E | A flint and stone church with a tiled roof | 11th century | St Mary's has suffered from repeated damage: by the French in 1217 and again in 1457, and from an earthquake in 1578. In 1667 the central tower collapsed, and was rebuilt. In the 19th century the church was restored by Joseph Clarke. Since being made redundant it has been used as an arts centre. | I |
| All Saints Shirburn | Oxfordshire; 51.6577°N 0.9946°W | A stone church with a tiled roof and a tower on the left | 11th–12th century | All Saints stands immediately to the south of Shirburn Castle, the seat of the Earls of Macclesfield. Its north chapel is the mausoleum of the Macclesfield family. The church was restored and largely rebuilt in 1876 by T. H. Wyatt. | II |
| St Mary Ashley | Hampshire; 51.0762°N 1.4519°W | A simple small church with a red roof seen from the southeast | Early 12th century | The chancel was added later in the 12th century, and the windows date from the 15th and 16th centuries. The church was restored twice in the 19th century. Inside the church is a Norman font. There is a painting of a saint in the splay of one of the windows. | II* |
| St Benedict Paddlesworth | Kent; 51.3332°N 0.4170°E | A very simple barn-like stone church with a tiled roof | Early 12th century | This simple church stands on the Pilgrims' Way. It closed as a church in 1678 and was then used for some 250 years for non-religious purposes, including use as a farm building. A gallery was added in the 19th century, and the church was restored twice during the 20th century. | II* |
| St Mary Burham | Kent; 51.3313°N 0.4626°E | A stone church with a tower just visible at the far end | 12th century | Standing on the Pilgrims' Way, this church served a now-deserted village. Its north and south aisles have been demolished. Inside the church are two Norman fonts. | I |
| St Mary Capel-le-Ferne | Kent; 51.1150°N 1.2235°E | A flint church with a red tiled roof and a short west tower | 12th century | St Mary's stands in an isolated position. A stone chancel arch was added in the 14th century containing a three-bay arcade. Above the arcade is a large round-headed opening that silhouetted the rood cross, a feature unique in England. The church also contains a memorial to General Sir Charles William Dunbar Staveley, who died in 1896. | I |
| St Margaret Catmore | Berkshire; 51.5186°N 1.3472°W | A simple rendered church with a red tiled roof and a bellcote | 12th century | The Norman features in this church include two doorways and the font. The nave roof dates from 1607. During the 19th century the church was restored and Norman Revival features were added, which were more ornate than the original Norman features. | I |
| Lumley Chapel Cheam | Greater London; 51.3606°N 0.2161°W | Part of a stone and brick chapel with a red tiled roof seen from an angle | 12th century | The chapel consists of the east end of the chancel of a former church that had been converted into a memorial chapel for the Lumley family of nearby Nonsuch Palace. It contains memorials to the Lumleys and to other families. The chapel is the oldest standing building in the London Borough of Sutton. | II* |
| St Peter ad Vincula Colemore | Hampshire; 51.0719°N 0.9937°W | A mainly flint church with red tied roofs and bellcote with a spirelet | 12th century | The plan of this church was formerly cruciform, but in 1669 the parishioners considered that the interior was too dark, and they successfully petitioned the bishop for the south transept to be removed. The remaining north transept has a 12th-century doorway in its west wall, a 12th-century window in the north wall, and an 11th-century window in the east wall. Inside the church are a 12th-century font made from Purbeck Marble and a 16th-century wooden screen. | II* |
| St Michael East Peckham | Kent; 51.2445°N 0.3792°E | Stone church, the chancel roofed in red tiles the nave in slates, at the far end rendered tower surmounted by a small spirelet | 12th century | St Michael's expanded to its present size in about 1300, and it was restored in the 19th century by Joseph Clarke. It contains one Norman window. Elsewhere there are Perpendicular-style windows that were renewed during the restoration. | II* |
| St Mary Fleet Marston | Buckinghamshire; 51.8369°N 0.8697°W | A small church without a tower, with nave and chancel roofed in red tiles | 12th century | Set in an isolated position surrounded by fields, the church was restored by George Gilbert Scott in 1868. John Wesley preached a sermon here soon after his ordination in 1725. The fittings of the church include a Norman font. | II* |
| St Mary the Virgin Fordwich | Kent; 51.2958°N 1.1271°E | A shingled broach spire on a flint tower | 12th century | Dating mainly from the Norman era, the church incorporates some Saxon material in the nave. Inside the church are box pews, and a civic pew containing a stand to hold the mayor's mace. Also in the church is the Fordwich stone, dating from about 1100 and considered to be part of the former shrine of a saint. | I |
| St Bartholomew Goodnestone | Kent; 51.3166°N 0.9322°E | A flint church with red tiled roofs and a bellcote at the far end | 12th century | The plan of this flint church is simple, consisting of a nave with a north porch, and a chancel. The porch was rebuilt in 1837 after it had been damaged by an earth tremor. The stained glass in the east window is by Thomas Willement. | I |
| St Mary Luddenham | Kent; 51.3324°N 0.8586°E | A flint and rendered church with a red tiled roof and a tower with a brick upper part | 12th century | This flint church stands in a farmyard, and its structure incorporates some re-used Roman tiles. The west door is Norman, and is decorated with zigzags. Inside the church is a 13th-century coffin lid carved with hands holding a heart. | I |
| St John the Baptist Mongewell | Oxfordshire; 51.5861°N 1.1233°W | Ruins of a church showing a round tower with a hexagonal top and the roofless nave | 12th century | Partly ruined, the church stands to the north of Mongewell Park, near The Ridgeway long-distance path. It was remodelled in picturesque Gothic style in the late 18th century for Rev Shute Barrington, Bishop of Durham. The structure consists of a roofless nave, a roofed chancel, and a west tower. | II |
| St Mary Newnham Murren | Oxfordshire; 51.5919°N 1.1203°W | A small flint church with red tiled roofs and a bellcote at the far end | 12th century | St Mary's is at the end of a farm track, overlooking the River Thames. The doorway and chancel arch are both Norman. In 1849 the church was restored and most of the fittings were removed, although a Jacobean pulpit and communion table are still present. | II* |
| St Mary (old) Preston Candover | Hampshire; 51.1687°N 1.1380°W | A small structure with a white painted wall and a tiled roof | 12th century | Only the chancel of the church remains. The church was damaged in a fire in 1681 and rebuilt, then enlarged in 1831. However, by 1885 its fabric had deteriorated so much that, except for the chancel, it was demolished, and a new church with the same dedication was built nearer the centre of the village. | II* |
| St Mary Magdalene Tortington | West Sussex; 50.8357°N 0.5769°W | A flint church with a tiled roof and a small white weatherboarded bellcote | 12th century | Both the doorway and the chancel arch are Norman in style, and are decorated with elaborate carvings. The font dates from the 12th century, and some of the windows contain stained glass from the Kempe studio. | II |
| All Saints Waldershare | Kent; 51.1875°N 1.2858°E | The west end of a flint church with two large buttresses and a slate roof | 12th century | Mortuary chapels were added to the church in about 1697 and in about 1712, and the main part of the church was restored and virtually rebuilt in 1886 by Ewan Christian. The chapels contain large and elaborate memorials. Also in the church are wall paintings by Clayton and Bell dating from about 1886. The North Downs Way passes through the churchyard. | II* |
| St John the Baptist Upper Eldon | Hampshire; 51.0483°N 1.4816°W | A simple flint church with a red tiled roof | Late 12th century | Despite repairs in the 18th century, the condition of the building was so bad by the following century that it was being used as a cowshed. Since being vested in the Trust, further repairs have been undertaken. Around the church are nine consecration cross stones, each consisting of a circle in which there are five holes that formerly held metal crosses. | II* |
| St Andrew (Old) Kingsbury | Greater London; 51.5680°N 0.2618°W | | 12th-13th century | The condition of this church had deteriorated towards the end of the 18th century. A major restoration was carried out in 1840, and it became a chapel of ease to a church in another part of the parish. In 1933 a new church, also dedicated to Saint Andrew, was moved from the Marylebone area of London and erected adjacent to the older church. The church is now used as a place of worship by the Romanian Orthodox Church under a 20-year lease. | I |
| St Giles' Merston | West Sussex; 50.8162°N 0.7328°W | A small simple church with a west bellcote seen from the south | Early 13th century | The church is small and simple, consisting of a nave and chancel without any division, a narrow north aisle, and a south porch. It has a deep sweeping roof, and a bellcote on the west gable. | I |
| St Thomas à Becket Capel | Kent; 51.1764°N 0.3410°E | A stone church with a tower and red tiled roof | 13th century | The tower of the church had to be partly rebuilt following a fire in 1639. Wall paintings depicting biblical scenes, probably dating from the 13th century, were rediscovered in 1967. It is said that Thomas à Becket preached either in the church, or under a yew tree in the churchyard. | I |
| St Wilfrid Church Norton, Selsey | West Sussex; 50.7549°N 0.7652°W | The remaining chancel of a church with a steep red tiled roof | 13th century | Now known as St Wilfrid's Chapel, it consists of the 13th-century chancel of a former church. In 1865 the rest of the church was demolished, and the material was used in the construction of a larger church in the centre of the village. It contains a large monument dating from 1537 flanked by carvings depicting Saint George and the martyrdom of Saint Agnes. Also in the chapel is modern stained glass, including a window by Michael Farrar-Bell. | I |
| St James Cooling | Kent; 51.4553°N 0.5264°E | A stone church with a tower and a red tiled roof | 13th century | Building of the church was complete by about 1400. It was restored in the 19th century, when a vestry was added, and the porch was rebuilt. The interior of the vestry is completely lined with cockle shells, the emblem of Saint James. | I |
| St Mary Edlesborough | Buckinghamshire; 51.8617°N 0.5927°W | An impressive stone church on a hill with a battlemented tower and nave | 13th century | Standing in an elevated position, this church with its limestone tower is a local landmark. It was restored following a fire in 1828. Its contents include medieval wooden carvings on a complete chancel screen, misericords, and a four-tier tester. Some of the walls are decorated with 19th-century paintings. | I |
| St Nicholas Freefolk | Hampshire; 51.2346°N 1.3033°W | A small, simple, white church, with a red tiled roof and a wooden bellcote | 13th century | The church consists of a single rectangular cell. It has a weatherboarded bellcote with a pyramidal roof. The walls are partly rendered, and are supported by brick buttresses. The windows are Perpendicular in style. The contents of the church include a large Jacobean monument, two hatchments, a Royal arms dated 1701, and a Victorian font. | I |
| St Mary Hartley Wintney | Hampshire; 51.2968°N 0.9002°W | A stone church with a battlemented tower and brick transepts | 13th century | When the nuns of Wintney Priory built the church it consisted of a nave and a chancel. The transepts and the tower were added in the middle of the 19th century. When its functions were replaced by a new parish church, it became a mortuary chapel. On its walls are the remains of 13th-century wall paintings, including one depicting Saint Christopher. | II* |
| St Mary Pitstone | Buckinghamshire; 51.8251°N 0.6342°W | A stone tower with a battlemented parapet | 13th century | St Mary's is constructed in limestone and flint. It has a three-stage tower with a stair turret, and an embattled parapet. The axis of the chancel is inclined to the north. In the church are a stoup, a squint, a piscina with a crocketted gable, a 12th-century font, and a 17th-century hexagonal pulpit with a sounding board. | I |
| St Peter Preston Park | East Sussex; 50.8423°N 0.1495°W | | 13th century | This church stands in the grounds of Preston Manor. The nave was restored in 1872 by James Woodman when the south vestry was added. The chancel was restored in 1878 by Ewan Christian; this included stencil decoration of the walls. The nave was damaged by fire in 1906, and restored by P. M. Johnston. The fire damaged the 14th-century wall paintings, but fragments remain depicting, among other subjects, the martyrdom of Thomas à Becket and The Nativity. | II* |
| St Peter Sandwich | Kent; 51.2749°N 1.3403°E | A stone church with a central tower, red tiled roofs, and a protruding vestry with a Dutch gable | 13th century | In 1560 St Peter's became the church for a group of Dutch Protestants. The tower collapsed in 1661, destroying the south aisle. The tower was rebuilt, but the south aisle was left ruined and the south arcade was filled in. A cupola was added to the top of the tower. In the 1860s the west end was restored after it was damaged in a storm. Under the chancel is a vaulted undercroft lit by two 13th-century openings, which was probably used as a charnel house. | I |
| St Peter Swingfield | Kent; 51.1465°N 1.1910°E | A flint church with a square tower and a circular stair turret, and red tiled roofs | 13th century | The 13th-century square tower has a circular southwest stair turret rising higher than the tower. The church was close associations with the Knights Hospitallers. The body of the church dates mainly from the 14th century, and was restored in 1870. Some of the stained glass dates from the 20th century. | I |
| Holy Sepulchre Warminghurst | West Sussex; 50.9403°N 0.4114°W | | 13th century | The plan of this sandstone church is simple, consisting of a nave and chancel in one cell, with a north chapel now used as a vestry. At the west end is a bell turret with a broach spire. It was restored in the early 18th century when a timber screen was inserted between the nave and chancel. This contains three arches, above which is a tympanum elaborately painted with the royal arms of Queen Anne. Most of the other fittings also date from this restoration. | I |
| St Bartholomew Lower Basildon | Berkshire; 51.5091°N 1.1201°W | | Late 13th century | The tower was built in 1734, and during a restoration in 1875–76 the porch and north aisle were added. Inside the church are a number of memorials, including one to Sir Francis Sykes, who died in 1804, by John Flaxman. The agricultural reformer Jethro Tull was christened and buried in the church. | I |
| St Lawrence Broughton | Buckinghamshire; 52.0522°N 0.6979°W | A stone church seen from the south with an embattled tower on the left | 14th century | The church is notable for its wall paintings dating from about 1400. When they were rediscovered during a restoration in 1849 they had been covered in plaster for 300 years. The paintings were restored in the 1930s and depict, among other subjects, Saint George and the dragon, and Saints Helena and Eligius. There is also a doom painting and a Pietà; these were intended to be a warning against swearing. The stained glass includes windows designed by A. Gibbs and C. E. Kempe. | I |
| St Michael Thornton | Buckinghamshire; 52.0194°N 0.9054°W | A three-storey, castellated, tower to the left, with a wide nave and aisles. All in white limestone | 14th century | The plan of the church consists of a nave with north and south aisles. The chancel and a north chapel were demolished between 1780 and 1800 when the church was reordered. The aisles contain box pews, including a larger one for the lord of the manor. There is no seating in the nave, which is occupied by a series of memorials. One of these is a re-assembled tomb chest that had been moved out of the church in the 19th century and used to form a grotto. | I |
| St Clement Knowlton | Kent; 51.2338°N 1.2669°E | A simple small flint church with a red tiled roof and a bellcote at the far end | 14th–15th century | Originally the private chapel to Knowlton Court, it later became a parish church. It contains monuments to members of the families who lived in Knowlton Court, including the Peyton Baronets. Other memorials are one to Sir John Narborough, who died in 1688, and another to his sons, John and James, who together with Cloudesley Shovell died in a shipwreck off the Scilly Islands in 1707. The latter memorial has been attributed to Grinling Gibbons. | I |
| St George Esher | Surrey; 51.3693°N 0.3645°W | The western part of a simple stone church with a tiled roof and a weatherboarded bellcote | 1540 | Built shortly after the Reformation, this church is in Tudor style. In 1725 an extension was added to the south of the nave known as the Newcastle Pew. This was designed as a family pew by Sir John Vanbrugh for the 1st Duke of Newcastle. At its front, overlooking the nave, is a row of Corinthian columns surmounted by a pediment. The church also contains a three-decker pulpit with a tester. | I |
| Chandos Mausoleum Little Stanmore | Greater London; 51.6083°N 0.2894°W | | 1735 | The mausoleum was added to the north side of the church of St Lawrence Whitchurch for the 1st Duke of Chandos in 1735. It was designed by James Gibbs, and contains memorials to members of the Chandos family. The church itself continues to be in active use, and the mausoleum is vested in the Trust. | I |
| St Mary Hartwell | Buckinghamshire; 51.8052°N 0.8486°W | The tower and part of the body of a stone church | 1753–55 | An early example of Gothic Revival architecture, St Mary's was intended to be a feature in the grounds of Hartwell House. Its plan is octagonal, with towers at the east and west ends. By the time it was vested in the Trust, it was a roofless ruin. The Trust has carried out repairs, including rebuilding the roof in its original design using Westmorland slate. | II* |
| St Katherine Chiselhampton | Oxfordshire; 51.6887°N 1.1447°W | The simple west end of a church with a complex two-stage bellcote containing a clock in the lower stage | 1762 | St Katherine's is a Georgian church with rendered walls and limestone dressings. At the west end is a two-stage turret, the lower stage containing a clock, and the upper stage being open. Other than the 17th-century pulpit, all the fittings date from the 18th century. When the church was threatened with demolition in the 1950s, its survival was supported by Sir John Betjeman who wrote a verse relating to it. | II* |
| St Peter Wallingford | Oxfordshire; 51.6007°N 1.1217°W | An arched bridge beyond which is a tower with a belfry and spire | 1763 | The spire, designed by Sir Robert Taylor, was added in 1776–77, and the chancel was built in 1904. The nave and tower are in Neoclassical style, and the chancel is Gothic Revival. The church hosts a series of chamber music concerts each summer. | II* |
| All Saints (old) Nuneham Courtenay | Oxfordshire; 51.6805°N 1.2182°W | A Neoclassical church with a portico and a dome | 1764 | Replacing an earlier church on its site in the grounds of Nuneham House, it was designed by the owner of the house, the 1st Earl Harcourt, with alterations made by the architect James Stuart. It is in Neoclassical style, its design said to based on one of the temples of Palmyra. The north front has a projecting portico with six Ionic columns surmounted by an entablature consisting of a dentil cornice and a triangular pediment. The east and west fronts have half domes, and the main central dome contains four Diocletian windows. | II* |
| St John the Evangelist Chichester | West Sussex; 50.8354°N 0.7748°W | | 1812–13 | Designed in Georgian style with an elongated octagonal plan, the church was not a parish church, but was paid for by the trustees of the Evangelical movement. A gallery runs round the whole of the interior, with the organ at the east end. The rich sat in pews in the gallery, while the poor were on the benches below. The three-decker pulpit stands in a central position at the east end; it is circular and is carried on a spirally fluted stem. | I |
| St Andrew Hove | East Sussex; 50.8235°N 0.1569°W | | 1827–28 | This is the first church in England to be designed in Italianate style, the architect being Sir Charles Barry. In 1882 Barry's son, Edward Middleton Barry, added the chancel, and further additions were made in 1925, including baldacchinos around the altar and the font. Surmounting the west front is a clock turret. Above the crossing is a dome, the interior of which is painted blue. Under the church is a crypt. During the 19th century the church was used by members of the royal family and the aristocracy. | I |
| St Mary Lambourn Woodlands | Berkshire; 51.4731°N 1.5207°W | A flint church with steep roofs and an octagonal belfry and spire | 1852 | Thomas Talbot Bury, a pupil of Augustus Charles Pugin, designed the church in Gothic Revival style. At the west end is an octagonal spire. The reredos was carved by John Bacon, the son of the first parish priest. | II |
| St Catherine Kingsdown | Kent; 51.2943°N 0.7600°E | A short stone church with a tall narrow tower and spire | 1865 | This is the only complete Anglican church to have been designed by E. W. Pugin, and it has remained virtually unaltered since. In a niche above the main doorway is a sculpture of Saint Catherine, and over the vestry door is a sculpture of the Conversion of Saint Paul. All the fittings and furniture were designed by Pugin, including the stained glass, which was made by Hardman. | II |
| St Mary Itchen Stoke | Hampshire; 51.0884°N 1.2031°W | | 1866 | The church was designed by Henry Conybeare, the brother of its rector, in French Gothic style, and was based on La Sainte-Chapelle in Paris. Along the sides of the church are four sets of three tall lancet windows, and at the west end is a rose window. The interior is highly decorated, with a painted roof, a tiled floor, a font inlaid with different types of marble, and brightly coloured stained glass in the windows. | II* |
| Holy Trinity Privett | Hampshire; 51.0381°N 1.0362°W | A stone church with a south transept, clerestory and a broach spire | 1876–78 | Funded by the gin distiller William Nicholson, the church was designed by Sir Arthur Blomfield, and has not been altered since. It is in Early English Gothic Revival style. On the tall tower is a broach spire with lucarnes. The internal walls are constructed in Ham stone with bands of Bath Stone, and the church is floored with marble mosaic. | II* |

== See also ==
For lists of churches preserved by the Churches Conservation Trust in other regions see:

- East of England
- English Midlands
- Northern England
- Southwest England

== Notes ==
^{A} The dates given for construction are often not exactly known. Where this is the case the century of first construction of the existing building is given.
