= Goodnestone =

Goodnestone may refer to:

- Goodnestone, Dover
- Goodnestone, Swale
- Goodnestone, a volume of poems published by Andrew Motion
