= Luddenham =

Luddenham may refer to:

- Luddenham, Kent - a hamlet or small village near Faversham in Kent, England.
- Luddenham, New South Wales - a suburb of Sydney, in the state of New South Wales, Australia.
