= Curfew bell =

Bell rung in Medieval England

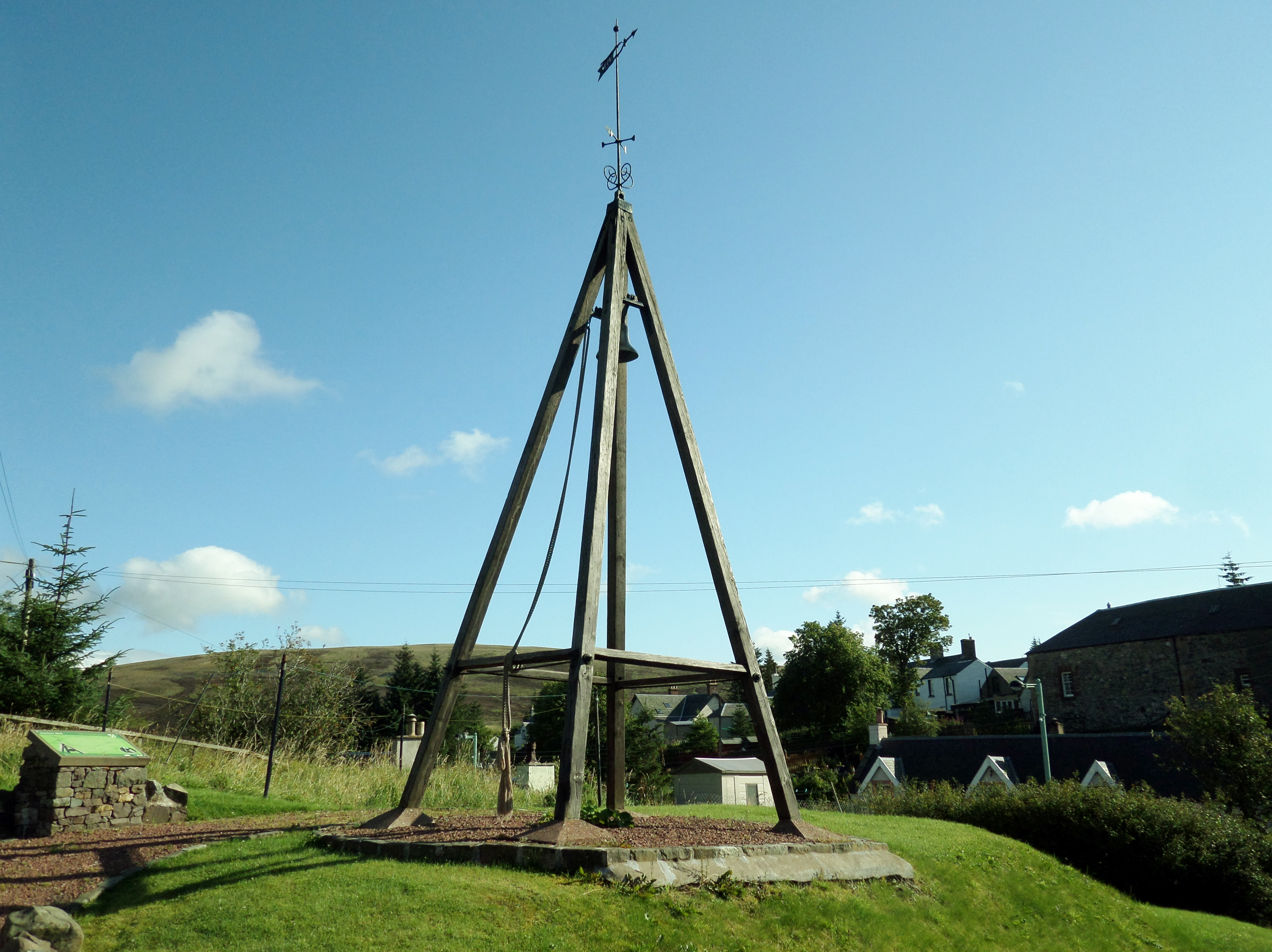
Curfew bell at Leadhills

The curfew bell was a bell rung in the evening in Medieval Great Britain and Ireland as a curfew signal.

== History ==
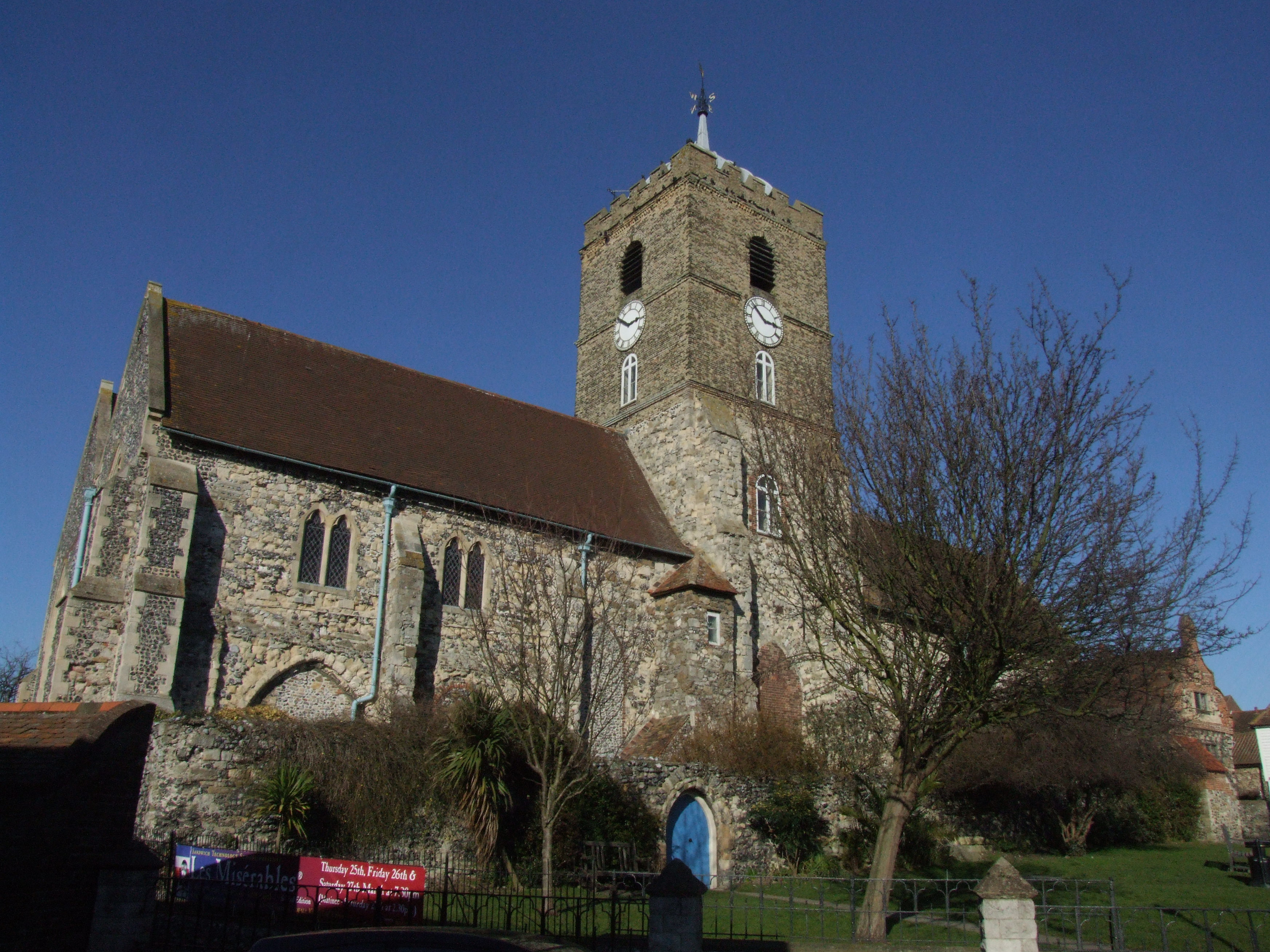
St Peter's Church, Sandwich, where a curfew bell is still rung at 8 pm every evening.

The custom of ringing the curfew bell continued in many British towns and cities, especially in the north of England, well into the 19th century, although by then it had ceased to have any legal status.

Except through WW2, a curfew bell has rung continuously every evening in the town of Wallingford Oxfordshire (formally Berkshire) since 1068. In 1066, William the Conqueror came to Wallingford seeking a suitable place to cross the Thames. During his stay, the Archbishop of Canterbury succumbed to William. For their co-operation the people of Wallingford were given an extra hour before curfew - 9pm instead of 8pm. The curfew bell still tolls at 8.50pm, declaring the king's ancient favour. The town celebrates its curfew bell with special events and during the annual Bunkfest Music Festival, permission is asked from the Mayor to break Curfew.

The tradition is still practised in the town of Sandwich, Kent, where a curfew bell known as the "Pig Bell" at St Peter's Church is rung at 8 pm every evening for ten minutes. At Ruthin in Denbighshire, the custom lapsed in the 1970s but was revived in 2020 after the bells of St Peter's Church were restored.

Inverness, Scotland rang a curfew bell at 5 p.m. from Old High St Stephen's; it was later moved to 8 p.m. The custom was once widespread in Scotland.

Ruthin, Wales had a curfew bell at 8 p.m. to warn all citizens to be indoors at night.

In Ireland, Coleraine had a curfew bell at 8 p.m., after which all country-dwellers (mostly Irish Catholics) had to be outside the city walls. Similarly, in the Penal era (up to the 18th century), St. Eugene's Cathedral, Derry rang a curfew bell at 9 p.m. after which Catholics had to be outside the city walls.

== Etymology ==
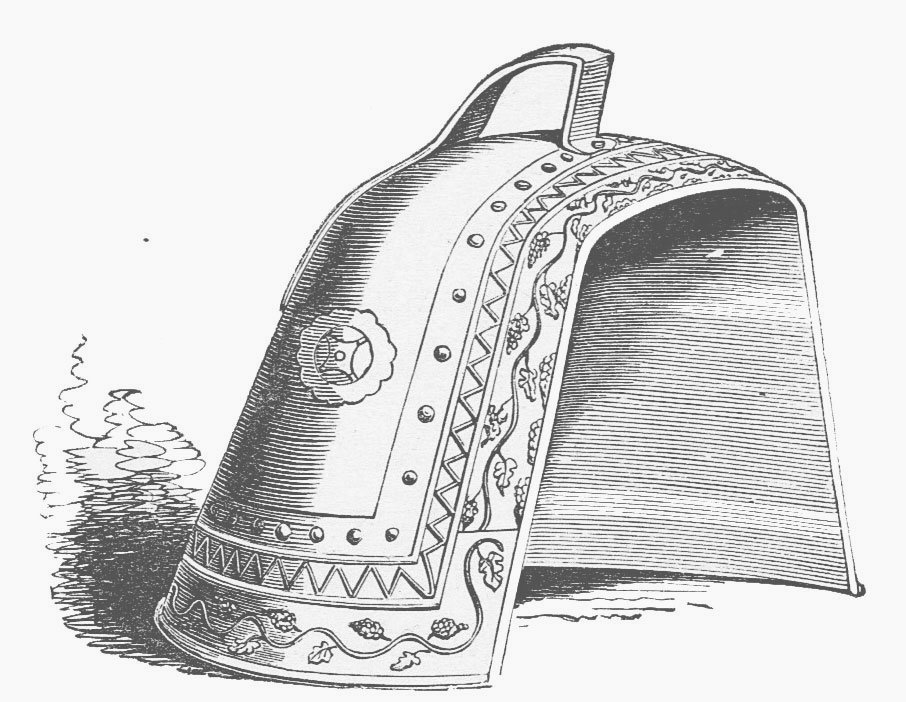
Couvre-feu utensil shield for putting out fireplace fires

At Penrith, Cumbria in the 19th century, the curfew was known as the "Taggy Bell", thought to be derived from the Old Norse tœkke, "to cover".

== Poetry ==
The tyranny of William I is described by the poet Francis Thompson,

The shiv'ring wretches, at the curfew sound,
Dejected sunk into their sordid beds,
And, through the mournful gloom of ancient times,
Mus'd sad, or dreamt of better.

Chaucer writes on the curfew bell as just as a time, not a law:

The dede slepe, for every besinesse,
Fell on this carpenter, right as I gesse,
About curfew time, or litel more.

Shakespeare had unusual times for the curfew bell. In Romeo and Juliet, iv 4, he has Lord Capulet saying:

Come, stir, stir, stir, the second coch hath crow'd,
The curfew bell hath rung, tis three o'clock.

In Tempest, v. 1, Prospero says:

You, whose pastime'
Is to make midnight mushrooms, that rejoice
To hear the solemn curfew.

In King Lear, iii. 4, Edgar speaks,

This is the foul fiend, Flibbertigibbet: he begins at curfew
and walks to the first clock.

In the sixteenth century Bishop Joseph Hall's "Fourth Satire" it reads:

Who ever gives a paire of velvet shooes
To th' Holy Rood, or liberally allowes,
But a new rope to ring the couvre-few bell,
But he desires that his great deed may dwell,
Or graven in the chancel window glasse,
Or in his lasting tombe of plated brasse.

In the play The Merry Devil of Edmonton (published 1608), the curfew was at nine o'clock in the evening:

Well, 'tis nine a clocke, 'tis time to ring curfew

John Milton's put in his allegorical Il Penseroso's mouth the words:

Oft on a plat of rising ground,
I hear the far-off curfew sound,
Over some wide-water'd shore,
Swinging slow, with sullen roar...

In Handel's L'Allegro, il Penseroso ed il Moderato these words are accompanied by a pizzicato bass-line, representing a distant bell sound.

The most famous mention of the curfew in English poetry is in Thomas Gray's Elegy Written in a Country Churchyard (1750), whose opening lines are:

The curfew tolls the knell of parting day,
The lowing herd wind slowly o'er the lea,
The ploughman homeward plods his weary way,
And leaves the world to darkness and to me

T. S. Eliot Gus the theater cat ("Old possum's book of practical cats")

When the curfew was rung, then I swung on the bell!

Eleanor Farjeon and Herbert Farjeon, William I – 1066 in Kings and Queens (1932). These poems were used to teach history to generations of British schoolchildren:

So William decided these rebels to quell
By ringing a curfew – a sort of a bell
And if any Saxon was found out of bed
After eight o'clock sharp it was "Off with his head!"

== Bibliography ==
- Andrews, William, Old Church Lore, William Andrews & Company, The Hull Press; London, 1891
- Brand, John et al.,Observations on the Popular Antiquities of Great Britain: Chiefly Illustrating the Origin of Our Vulgar and Provincial Customs, Ceremonies, and Superstitions, George Bell and Sons, 1901
- Thomas, Michael Joseph, "Missing The Curfew: A Cultural History Case For Re-Reading Thomas Gray's Most Famous Line" (2016). Graduate College Dissertations and Theses. Paper 590.
- Anthony Wood and John Peshall, The Antient and Present State of the City of Oxford: Containing an Account of Its Foundation, Antiquity, Situation, Suburbs, Division by Wards, Walls, Castle, Fairs, Religious Houses, Abbeys, St. Frideswede's, Churches, as Well Those Destroyed as the Present, with Their Monumental Inscriptions, J. and F. Rivington, 1773, Oxford University
