= St Bartholomew's Church, Goodnestone =

Coordinates: 51.3166°N 0.9322°E

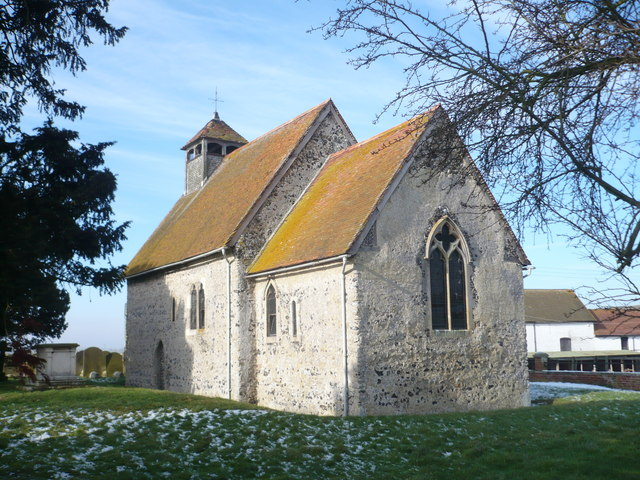
- St Bartholomew's Church, Goodnestone, from the southeast

- Location in Kent
- OS grid reference: TR 044 616
- Location: Goodnestone, Kent
- Country: England
- Denomination: Anglican
- Website: Churches Conservation Trust

History
- Dedication: Saint Bartholomew

Architecture
- Functional status: Redundant
- Heritage designation: Grade I
- Designated: 24 January 1967
- Architectural type: Church
- Style: Norman, Gothic

Specifications
- Materials: Flint, tiled roof

St Bartholomew's Church is a redundant Anglican church in the village of Goodnestone, Kent, England. It is recorded in the National Heritage List for England as a designated Grade I listed building, and is under the care of the Churches Conservation Trust. The village is some 1.5 miles (2.4 km) east of Faversham, to the west of the A299 road.

== History ==
St Bartholomew's is a Norman church built in the 12th century. Alterations and additions were made in the 14th and 15th centuries. The porch was rebuilt in 1837 after it had been damaged by an earth tremor. In 1876 the church was restored at a cost of £400 (equivalent to £40,000 in 2025). The church was declared redundant on 1 June 1985, and was vested in the Churches Conservation Trust on 14 November 1996. In 1997 extensive repairs were undertaken. The church is open daily to visitors.

== Architecture ==
The church is constructed in flint with a tiled roof. Its plan is simple, consisting of a nave with a north porch, and a chancel. On the west gable is a wooden bellcote. In the north and south wall are lancet windows, otherwise the windows are Perpendicular in style. The west window has three lights and the east window has two. The stained glass in the east window is by Thomas Willement, and it is possible that the glass in the west window is by the same designer. The chancel arch dates from the 14th century. In the chancel is a combined piscina and sedilia. In the nave is another piscina and a rood stair. The north wall of the chancel contains a tomb recess. The font is small and dates from the 19th century.

== External features ==
In the churchyard is a chest tomb dating from the early 19th century that has been listed at Grade II.

== See also ==
- List of churches preserved by the Churches Conservation Trust in South East England
