= Listed buildings in Graveney with Goodnestone =

Historic structures in Kent, England

Graveney with Goodnestone is civil parish in the Swale District of Kent, England. It contains 18 listed buildings that are recorded in the National Heritage List for England. Of these two are grade I, two are grade II* and 14 are grade II.

This list is based on the information retrieved online from Historic England.

== Key ==
Grade	Criteria
I	Buildings that are of exceptional interest
II*	Particularly important buildings of more than special interest
II	Buildings that are of special interest

== Listing ==
Name	Grade	Location	Type	Completed (Note: The date given is the date used by Historic England as significant for the initial building or that of an important part in the structure's description.)	Date designated	Grid ref. (Note: The grid reference is based on the British national grid reference system, sometimes known as OSGB36, used by the Ordnance Survey.) Geo-coordinates	Notes	Entry number (Note: The "List Entry Number" is a unique number assigned to each listed building and scheduled monument by Historic England.)	Image	Wikidata
Sparrow Court	II				21 May 1986	TR0457662856; 51°19′41″N 0°56′06″E		1069143	Upload Photo	Q26321877
Chest Tomb to Stone Family About 5 Metres South of Church of St Batholomew, Goodnestone	II	Goodnestone, Goodnestone Lane			21 May 1986	TR0443661573; 51°18′59″N 0°55′56″E		1069145	Upload Photo	Q93338221
Church of St Bartholomew, Goodnestone	I	Goodnestone, Goodnestone Lane	church building		24 January 1967	TR0443661580; 51°19′00″N 0°55′56″E		1069144	Church of St Bartholomew, Goodnestone More images	Q7592601
Goodnestone Court	II*	Goodnestone Lane	building		27 August 1952	TR0447661657; 51°19′02″N 0°55′58″E		1107863	Goodnestone Court More images	Q17546341
Ewell Farmhouse	II*	1 and 2, Graveney Road			24 January 1967	TR0353760848; 51°18′37″N 0°55′08″E		1325225	Upload Photo	Q17546464
Barn and Stables 30 Metres South of Homestall House	II	Homestall Lane			23 September 1974	TR0390360685; 51°18′31″N 0°55′27″E		1325209	Upload Photo	Q26610786
Homestall House	II	Homestall Lane			24 January 1967	TR0390460726; 51°18′33″N 0°55′27″E		1069146	Upload Photo	Q26321879
Bridge House	II	Sandbanks Lane			21 May 1986	TR0505162209; 51°19′19″N 0°56′29″E		1069147	Upload Photo	Q26321880
Post Office	II	Sandbanks Lane			21 May 1986	TR0504362188; 51°19′19″N 0°56′29″E		1069148	Upload Photo	Q26321883
Sandbanks Farmhouse	II	Sandbanks Lane			21 May 1986	TR0395362637; 51°19′35″N 0°55′33″E		1119654	Upload Photo	Q26412962
Barn 30 Metres South of Murton's Farmhouse	II	Seasalter Road			21 May 1986	TR0518062435; 51°19′26″N 0°56′36″E		1069107	Upload Photo	Q26321817
Bridge Cottage	II	3, Seasalter Road			19 August 1974	TR0507462080; 51°19′15″N 0°56′30″E		1069149	Upload Photo	Q26321886
Bridge Cottages	II	1 and 2, Seasalter Road			21 May 1986	TR0505562078; 51°19′15″N 0°56′29″E		1119636	Upload Photo	Q26412945
Church of All Saints	I	Seasalter Road	church building		24 January 1967	TR0526962682; 51°19′34″N 0°56′41″E		1069110	Church of All Saints More images	Q17530026
Four Horse Shoes Inn	II	Seasalter Road			21 May 1986	TR0502062030; 51°19′14″N 0°56′27″E		1344024	Upload Photo	Q26627779
Graveney Court	II	Seasalter Road			27 August 1952	TR0526262726; 51°19′36″N 0°56′41″E		1069108	Upload Photo	Q26321819
Headstone to Thomas Barman in the Churchyard South East of the Church of All Saints	II	Seasalter Road			21 May 1986	TR0526762662; 51°19′34″N 0°56′41″E		1069109	Upload Photo	Q26321821
Murton's Farmhouse	II	Seasalter Road			21 May 1986	TR0519062470; 51°19′28″N 0°56′37″E		1344023	Upload Photo	Q26627778

== See also ==
- Grade I listed buildings in Kent
- Grade II* listed buildings in Kent

== Sources ==
- Newman, John (2013) [1969], Kent: North-East and East, The Buildings of England, New Haven and London: Yale University Press, ISBN 978-0-300-18506-5
