= All Saints Church, Shirburn =

Coordinates: 51.6577°N 0.9946°W

All Saints' Church, Shirburn
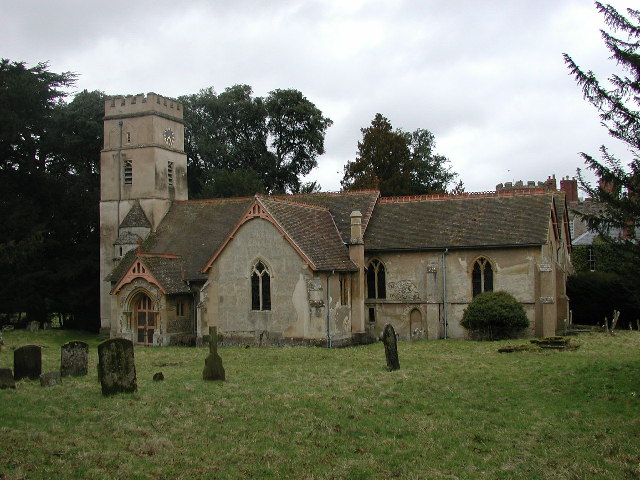
- All Saints' Church, Shirburn, from the south

- Location in Oxfordshire
- OS grid reference: SU 696 959
- Location: Shirburn, Oxfordshire
- Country: England
- Denomination: Anglican
- Website: Churches Conservation Trust

Architecture
- Functional status: Redundant
- Heritage designation: Grade II
- Designated: 18 July 1963
- Architect: T. H. Wyatt (1876 restoration)
- Architectural type: Church
- Style: Norman, Gothic, Georgian, Gothic Revival
- Completed: 1876

Specifications
- Materials: Rendered chalk and flint Brick north transept Tiled roofs

All Saints' Church is the redundant Church of England parish church of the parish of Shirburn, Oxfordshire, England. It is recorded in the National Heritage List for England as a designated Grade II listed building, and is in the care of the Churches Conservation Trust. The church is at the west end of the village, immediately south of Shirburn Castle, the seat of the Earls of Macclesfield since 1715. The north chapel of the church is the mausoleum of the Parker family, Earls of Macclesfield.

== History ==
The church dates from the late 11th or early 12th century. Additions and alterations were made in the 13th and 14th centuries. Further alterations took place in the 18th century, when the top stage was added to the tower, and in the early part of the 19th century, when a north transept was added "as a family pew for the Earl of Macclesfield". The church was restored and largely rebuilt in 1876 by T. H. Wyatt. It was declared redundant in 1995 and vested in the Churches Conservation Trust.

The church was used in 2011 as a shooting location for the television series Midsomer Murders.

== Architecture ==
Most of the church is in rendered chalk and flint rubble, and the north transept is in brick. The roofs are tiled. Its plan is cruciform. It consists of a nave with north and south aisles, north and south transepts, a south porch, a chancel with an organ chamber and a vestry to its north, and a west tower. To the south of the tower is a 19th-century circular staircase. On the north side of the tower is a two-light window which is probably Norman. The top stage of the tower is Georgian in style.

Above the medieval west window in the bottom stage of the tower is a reset Norman tympanum decorated with a figure-of-eight pattern. In the corresponding position inside the tower is a re-set Norman lintel, decorated with stars, beast heads and foliage. These were placed here in the 1876 restoration. The dates of the windows around the church spread from the 12th to the 19th century.

Inside the church are two 13th-century three-bay arcades between the nave and the aisles, and a two-bay arcade between the chancel and the north chapel. In the chancel and the transepts are memorials to the Chamberlain and Macclesfield families, and others. The south transept contains a 14th-century piscina, and in the nave is a 13th-century font with an 18th-century cover. The stained glass in the east window is by Ward and Hughes. The single-manual organ was made in the 1880s by Gray and Davison.

== See also ==
- List of churches preserved by the Churches Conservation Trust in South East England
