= Monins baronets =

Extinct baronetcy in the Baronetage of England

The Monins Baronetcy, of Waldershare in the County of Kent, was a title in the Baronetage of England. It was created on 29 June 1611 for William Monins. His son, the second Baronet, was High Sheriff of Kent in 1646. Upon his death his brother Thomas succeeded to the baronetcy but the Waldershare estate passed to his eldest daughter and to Peregrine Bertie whom she married. The baronetcy became extinct on the death of the third Baronet in 1678.

== Monins baronets, of Waldershare (1611) ==
- Sir William Monins, 1st Baronet (died 1643)
- Sir Edward Monins, 2nd Baronet (1600–1663)
- Sir Thomas Monins, 3rd Baronet (1604–1678)

Baronetage of England
Preceded by Hales baronets	Monins baronets 29 June 1611	Succeeded by Mildmay baronets
