= St Lawrence's Church, Broughton =

Coordinates: 52.0522°N 0.6979°W

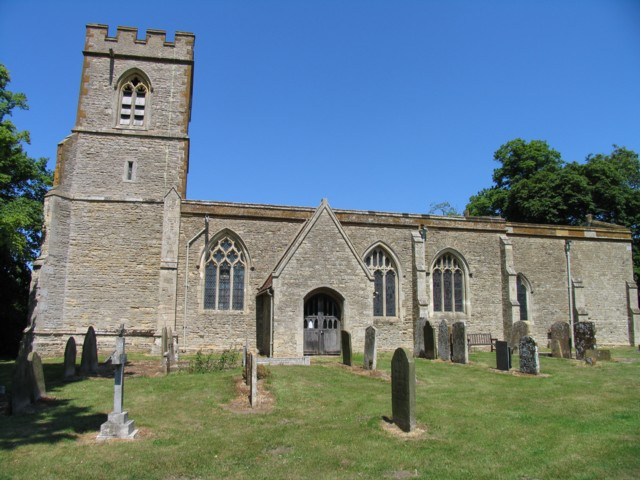
- St Lawrence's Church, Broughton, from the south

- Location in Buckinghamshire
- OS grid reference: SP 894 401
- Location: Broughton, Milton Keynes, Buckinghamshire
- Country: England
- Denomination: Anglican
- Website: Churches Conservation Trust

History
- Dedication: Saint Lawrence

Architecture
- Functional status: Redundant
- Heritage designation: Grade I
- Designated: 17 November 1966
- Architectural type: Church
- Style: Gothic

St Lawrence's Church is a redundant Anglican church in Broughton, Milton Keynes, Buckinghamshire, England. The church is recorded in the National Heritage List for England as a designated Grade I listed building, and is under the care of the Churches Conservation Trust. The church stands on the eastern periphery of Milton Keynes, between the A4146 and (former) A5130 roads. It is listed at Grade I because of its "remarkable series" of medieval wall paintings.

== History ==
The church was built in the 14th and 15th centuries. It was restored in the 19th century, when the chancel was rebuilt. In 1849 a series of medieval wall paintings were discovered that had been covered in plaster for 300 years. These were restored in the 1930s by Ernest William Tristram. The church was vested in the Churches Conservation Trust on 1 August 1987.

== Architecture ==
=== Exterior ===
St Lawrence's is constructed in stone, and has lead roofs with plain parapets. Its plan consists of a nave without aisles, a south porch, a chancel, and a west tower. The tower is in three stages with diagonal buttresses and an embattled parapet. On the south side of the church are three three-light windows. To the west of the porch is a 14th-century window with reticulated tracery, and to the east of the porch are two Perpendicular windows. On the north side of the church is a staircase to the rood loft.

=== Interior ===
The wall paintings in the nave date from about 1400. On the south wall is a depiction of Saint George and the dragon: Saint George lost his head in the 15th century when the ceiling was lowered. On the north wall there are a doom painting and a Pietà; these are designed as a warning against swearing. There are also paintings of Saint Helena and Saint Eligius. The pulpit dates from the late 17th or early 18th century. The memorials include a series of black marble stones under the altar, fragments of brasses from the 14th and 15th centuries, and a 17th-century wall monument. The stained glass in the east and south windows of the chancel by Kempe dates from 1894, and that in a south window in the nave dating from 1864 is by A. Gibbs. There is a ring of four bells, but these are no longer ringable. The oldest two were cast in about 1470 by William Chamberlain; the others were cast in 1622 by James Keene, and in 1655 by Anthony Chandler.

== See also ==
- List of churches preserved by the Churches Conservation Trust in South East England
