= St Peter's Church, Sandwich =

Coordinates: 51.2749°N 1.3403°E

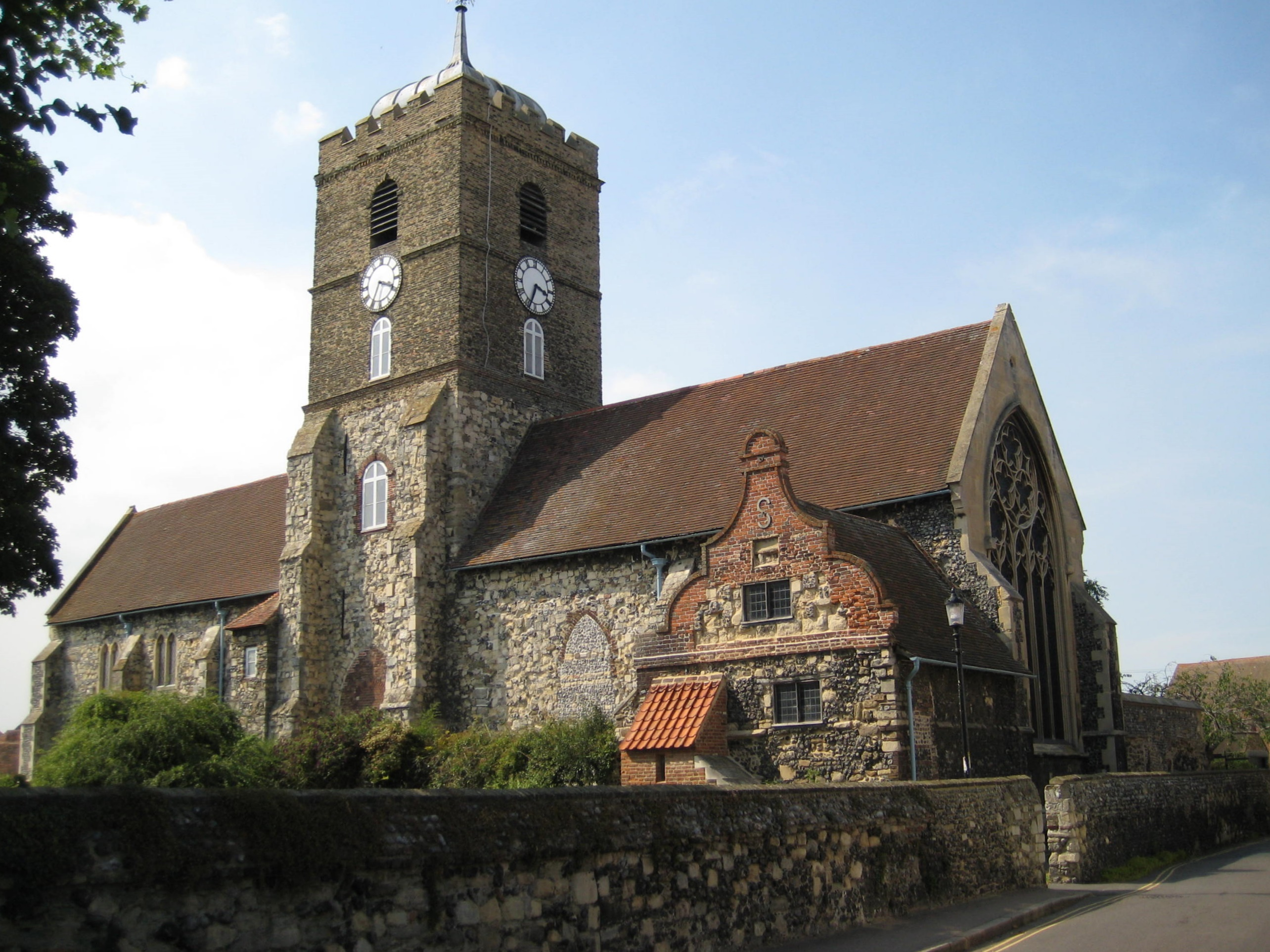
- St Peter's Church, Sandwich, from the southeast

- Location in Kent
- OS grid reference: TR 331 580
- Location: Sandwich, Kent
- Country: England
- Denomination: Anglican
- Website: Churches Conservation Trust

History
- Dedication: Saint Peter

Architecture
- Functional status: Redundant
- Heritage designation: Grade I
- Designated: 19 May 1950
- Architect: William White (?) (restoration)
- Architectural type: Church
- Style: Gothic

Specifications
- Materials: Mixture of pebbles, stone rubble, and brick Roofs tiled

St Peter's Church is a redundant Anglican church in Sandwich, Kent, England. It is recorded in the National Heritage List for England as a designated Grade I listed building, and is under the care of the Churches Conservation Trust.

== Early history ==
A Norman church stood on the site of the present church by about 1100. This was probably destroyed in 1216 when Sandwich was attacked by the French. The church was rebuilt during the 13th century, it is thought, by Carmelite friars from France. At this time the church consisted of a nave with north and south aisles, a tower and a chancel. Beneath the chancel was a vaulted undercroft, which was probably used as a charnel house. During the 14th century the north aisle was widened and raised in height, and a chantry chapel was built at the east end of the south aisle. The north porch was added in the following century.

In 1560 a group of Flemish Protestants from the Spanish Netherlands came to live in Sandwich, and St Peter's became their church. The tower collapsed in 1661, destroying the south aisle. The Flemings rebuilt the tower, but left the south aisle ruined, and filled in the south arcade, making it the exterior south wall. They also added a cupola to the top of the tower. The church was restored during the 19th century. In the 1860s the west end was restored after it had been damaged in a storm, the roofs were retiled, the choir stalls were re-arranged, the box pews were replaced by bench seating, and the pulpit was moved from its position against the north wall to the southeast corner of the nave. It is thought that some of this might have been directed by the architect William White.

== Architecture ==
=== Exterior ===
The church is constructed in a mixture of materials, including pebbles, stone rubble, and brick. The roofs are tiled. Its plan consists of a nave, a central tower, a chancel, and a north aisle which stretches for almost the whole length of the church. At the southeast of the church is a two-storey vestry. There is a ruined vestry at the east end of the aisle. The tower is in three stages. The upper two stages, built after the collapse of 1661, contain round-headed windows and bell openings, and clock faces. The parapet is embattled, and on top of the tower is a square-domed cupola. On the south side of the bottom stage of the tower is a 17th-century window. Below this is the blocked south tower arch containing a blocked 17th-century window. On the south side of the nave and chancel are more blocked arches. Above the blocked arches in the nave is the 13th-century clerestory which contains paired lights. Protruding from the chancel is the south vestry, with a curved Dutch gable dating from the middle of the 16th century. This contains square 16th-century windows. The undercroft under the vestry, which is only partly below ground, is lit by two 13th-century openings. The east window dates from the 14th century, and is Decorated in style. There are further Decorated windows in the north aisle, and other windows dating from the 17th or 18th centuries. The north porch has an embattled parapet, and dates from the 15th century. This leads to a 14th-century door. The west door dates from the 19th century, and is in Decorated style.

=== Interior ===
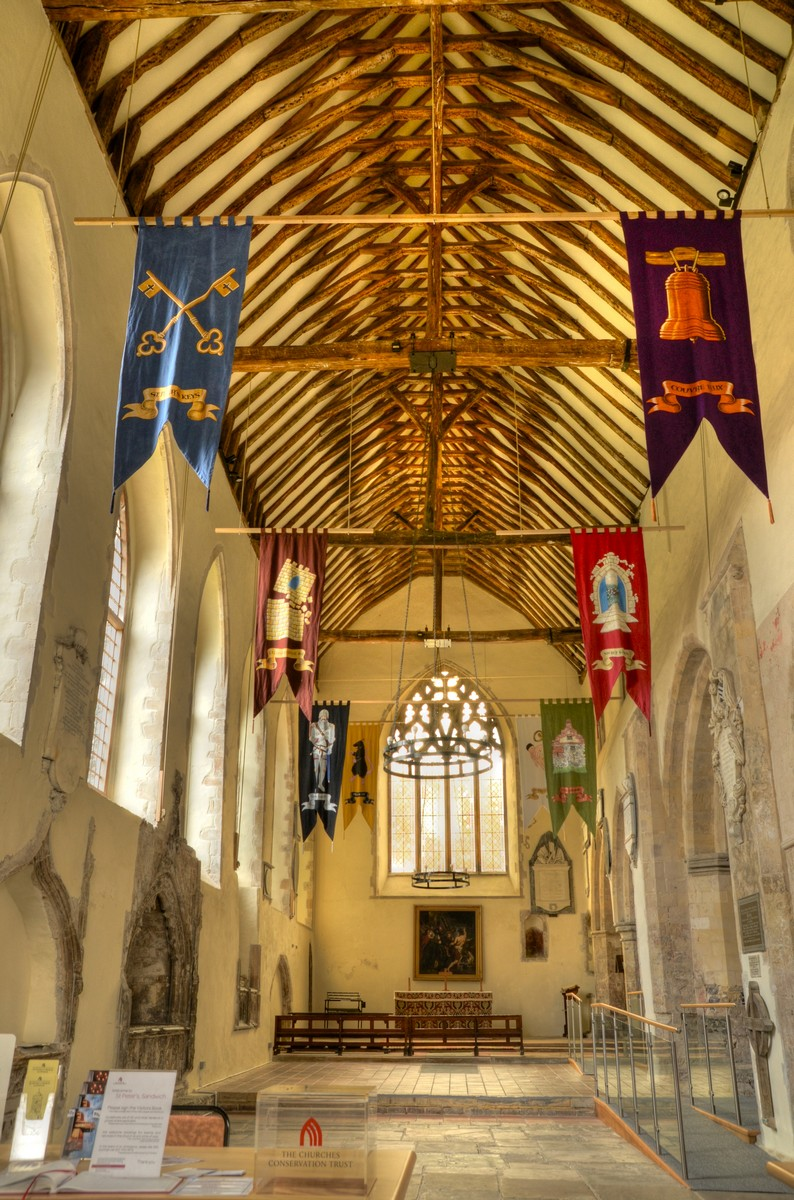
The interior of St Peter's Church

Between the nave and the north aisle is a three-bay arcade, and between the chancel and the aisle is a two-bay arcade; both are carried on polygonal piers. In the chancel is a three-seat sedilia, which dates from the 13th century, and a piscina. There is a blocked squint in the sedilia, and another in the north chapel. Also present in the church are the royal arms of Charles II. In the north aisle are a number of late 14th-century tomb recesses. The organ is small, having a single manual, four stops, and 173 pipes. It incorporates pipes taken from an earlier organ that was built in about 1880 by Charles H. Hobday, and was installed in the north aisle in 1895. It has since been rebuilt and now stands in the nave. There is a ring of eight bells, all cast in 1779 by William Mears. They are unringable because the tower is unsafe, having last been rung (except for the curfew bell) in 1913.

== Recent history and present day ==
In 1948 the parish of St Peter's was united with those of St Mary's and St Clement's. St Clement's became the parish church of Sandwich, and St Peter's was closed for regular worship. From 1952 it was used by Sir Roger Manwood's School as their chapel. On 22 February 1973 the church was declared redundant and it was vested in the Churches Conservation Trust on 16 April 1974. In the 1990s a garden was developed in what had been the ruins of the south aisle. The garden contains a two-light 14th-century window which was removed from the former St Thomas' Hospital, and erected on this site in 1923. In 2006 the Trust started a seven-year project to repair and redecorate the church. The care of the church is supported by a group known as the Friends of St Peter's. A programme of community events and occasional services is held in the church. At the west end of the church is a display relating to the Earls of Sandwich. The ancient custom of ringing the curfew bell from the church at 8pm daily still continues. The church is open daily for visitors.

== See also ==
- List of churches preserved by the Churches Conservation Trust in South East England
- St Mary's Church, Sandwich
