= Listed buildings in Stourmouth =

Civil Parish in Kent, England

Stourmouth is a village and civil parish in the Dover District of Kent, England. It contains 23 listed buildings that are recorded in the National Heritage List for England. Of these one is grade I, one is grade II* and 21 are grade II.

This list is based on the information retrieved online from Historic England.

== Key ==
Grade	Criteria
I	Buildings that are of exceptional interest
II*	Particularly important buildings of more than special interest
II	Buildings that are of special interest

== Listing ==
Name	Grade	Location	Type	Completed (Note: The date given is the date used by Historic England as significant for the initial building or that of an important part in the structure's description.)	Date designated	Grid ref. (Note: The grid reference is based on the British national grid reference system, sometimes known as OSGB36, used by the Ordnance Survey.) Geo-coordinates	Notes	Entry number (Note: The "List Entry Number" is a unique number assigned to each listed building and scheduled monument by Historic England.)	Image	Wikidata
Coachhouse About 20 Metres North East of Stourmouth House	II	East Stourmouth			26 November 1987	TR2661962623; 51°19′03″N 1°15′03″E		1070144	Upload Photo	Q26323750
Drum Cottage	II	East Stourmouth			26 November 1987	TR2629862256; 51°18′52″N 1°14′45″E		1281738	Upload Photo	Q26570754
Flight of Steps About 5 Metres East of Stourmouth House	II	East Stourmouth			26 November 1987	TR2659762609; 51°19′03″N 1°15′01″E		1070143	Upload Photo	Q26323748
Granary at Tr 2615 6221	II	East Stourmouth			26 November 1987	TR2614662206; 51°18′50″N 1°14′37″E		1203339	Upload Photo	Q26498884
Ivy House	II	East Stourmouth			26 November 1987	TR2630562290; 51°18′53″N 1°14′46″E		1363290	Upload Photo	Q26645123
Magpie Thatch	II	East Stourmouth			26 November 1987	TR2645662356; 51°18′55″N 1°14′54″E		1070142	Upload Photo	Q26323745
Stonehall Farm	II	East Stourmouth			11 October 1963	TR2641262414; 51°18′57″N 1°14′51″E		1203325	Upload Photo	Q26498871
Stourmouth House	II*	East Stourmouth			13 October 1952	TR2659162615; 51°19′03″N 1°15′01″E		1281733	Upload Photo	Q17557849
Barn About 60 Metres North West of Newhouse Farmhouse	II	Newhouse Corner			26 November 1987	TR2565362287; 51°18′54″N 1°14′12″E		1363291	Upload Photo	Q26645124
Newhouse Farm	II	Newhouse Corner			26 November 1987	TR2567062216; 51°18′51″N 1°14′13″E		1070145	Upload Photo	Q26323752
Outbuilding About 20 Metres South West of Newhouse Farmhouse	II	Newhouse Corner			26 November 1987	TR2563862210; 51°18′51″N 1°14′11″E		1281710	Upload Photo	Q26570728
Dog and Duck Cotatge	II	Pluck's Gutter			26 November 1987	TR2694863362; 51°19′27″N 1°15′21″E		1070146	Upload Photo	Q26323754
Rose Cottages Tiny Rose Cottage	II	2, West Stourmouth			26 November 1987	TR2541162467; 51°19′00″N 1°14′00″E		1363293	Upload Photo	Q26645126
Barn About 10 Metres South West of Paddledock Manor	II	West Stourmouth			26 November 1987	TR2543162530; 51°19′02″N 1°14′01″E		1070147	Upload Photo	Q26323756
Barn About 15 Metres South East of Dean Farmhouse	II	West Stourmouth			8 April 1981	TR2552362389; 51°18′57″N 1°14′06″E		1070148	Upload Photo	Q26323758
Barn About 30 Metres North West of North Court Farmhouse	II	West Stourmouth			26 November 1987	TR2555762946; 51°19′15″N 1°14′09″E		1203399	Upload Photo	Q26498936
Church of All Saints	I	West Stourmouth	church building		11 October 1963	TR2561662880; 51°19′13″N 1°14′12″E		1203363	Church of All Saints More images	Q4729541
Dean Farmhouse	II	West Stourmouth			8 April 1981	TR2550362403; 51°18′58″N 1°14′05″E		1203394	Upload Photo	Q26498931
Impetts Little Impetts	II	West Stourmouth			26 November 1987	TR2540462447; 51°18′59″N 1°14′00″E		1203395	Upload Photo	Q26498932
Northcourt Farmhouse	II	West Stourmouth			11 October 1963	TR2558562909; 51°19′14″N 1°14′10″E		1070149	Upload Photo	Q26323760
Paddledock Manor	II	West Stourmouth			11 October 1963	TR2545262549; 51°19′02″N 1°14′02″E		1281717	Upload Photo	Q26570735
Parish School/library About 15 Metres South of Church of All Saints	II	West Stourmouth			26 November 1987	TR2561662858; 51°19′12″N 1°14′11″E		1363292	Upload Photo	Q26645125
The Rectory	II	West Stourmouth			26 November 1987	TR2554462867; 51°19′13″N 1°14′08″E		1203396	Upload Photo	Q26498933

== See also ==
- Grade I listed buildings in Kent
- Grade II* listed buildings in Kent

== Sources ==
- Newman, John (2013) [1969], Kent: North-East and East, The Buildings of England, New Haven and London: Yale University Press, ISBN 978-0-300-18506-5
