= Listed buildings in Luddenham, Kent =

Historic structures in Kent, England

Luddenham is a village and civil parish in the Swale District of Kent, England. It contains 19 listed buildings that are recorded in the National Heritage List for England. Of these one is grade I and 18 are grade II.

This list is based on the information retrieved online from Historic England.

== Key ==
Grade	Criteria
I	Buildings that are of exceptional interest
II*	Particularly important buildings of more than special interest
II	Buildings that are of special interest

== Listing ==
Name	Grade	Location	Type	Completed (Note: The date given is the date used by Historic England as significant for the initial building or that of an important part in the structure's description.)	Date designated	Grid ref. (Note: The grid reference is based on the British national grid reference system, sometimes known as OSGB36, used by the Ordnance Survey.) Geo-coordinates	Notes	Entry number (Note: The "List Entry Number" is a unique number assigned to each listed building and scheduled monument by Historic England.)	Image	Wikidata
Barn 15 Metres South West of Nash's Farmhouse	II				21 May 1986	TQ9978262585; 51°19′38″N 0°51′58″E		1338560	Upload Photo	Q26622874
Chest Tomb 20 Metres North West of Church of St Mary	II				21 May 1986	TQ9921663159; 51°19′57″N 0°51′30″E		1344018	Upload Photo	Q26627773
Church of St Mary	I		church building		24 January 1967	TQ9923663137; 51°19′57″N 0°51′31″E		1069094	Church of St Mary More images	Q7594375
Elverton Farmhouse	II				21 May 1986	TQ9800962855; 51°19′49″N 0°50′27″E		1069092	Upload Photo	Q26321789
Granary 10 Metres South of Nash's Farmhouse	II				21 May 1986	TQ9979762578; 51°19′38″N 0°51′59″E		1344020	Upload Photo	Q26627775
Luddenham Court	II				27 August 1952	TQ9917363092; 51°19′55″N 0°51′28″E		1069095	Upload Photo	Q26321793
Monument 3 Metres North of Chancel of Church of St Mary	II				21 May 1986	TQ9924663146; 51°19′57″N 0°51′32″E		1338568	Upload Photo	Q26622882
Nash Cottage	II				13 August 1975	TQ9984862845; 51°19′46″N 0°52′02″E		1121862	Upload Photo	Q26415005
Nash Farm Cottages	II				13 August 1975	TQ9984962707; 51°19′42″N 0°52′02″E		1121896	Upload Photo	Q26415037
Nash's Farmhouse	II				24 January 1967	TQ9980562596; 51°19′38″N 0°51′59″E		1069097	Upload Photo	Q26321797
Oast Cottage	II				13 August 1975	TQ9937862566; 51°19′38″N 0°51′37″E		1069096	Upload Photo	Q26321795
Oasts 20 Metres East of Luddenham Court	II				21 May 1986	TQ9921563116; 51°19′56″N 0°51′30″E		1344019	Upload Photo	Q26627774
Outhouse 3 Metres West of Luddenham Court	II				21 May 1986	TQ9916063092; 51°19′55″N 0°51′27″E		1121914	Upload Photo	Q26415055
Pair of Headstones About 20 Metres South West of Church of St Mary	II				21 May 1986	TQ9922063119; 51°19′56″N 0°51′30″E		1121907	Upload Photo	Q26415048
The Mounted Rifleman	II				21 May 1986	TQ9814262761; 51°19′46″N 0°50′34″E		1344017	Upload Photo	Q26627772
The Old Rectory	II				24 January 1967	TQ9928262480; 51°19′35″N 0°51′32″E		1121886	Upload Photo	Q26415027
Hawkes and Beetles Farmhouse	II	Elverton			24 January 1967	TQ9866262876; 51°19′49″N 0°51′01″E		1069093	Upload Photo	Q26321791
Blackbird Cottage	II	Lower Road, Oare			24 January 1967	TQ9890261927; 51°19′18″N 0°51′11″E		1338542	Upload Photo	Q26622857
Howletts Farmhouse	II	Uplees Road			20 May 1975	TQ9946764376; 51°20′36″N 0°51′45″E		1123736	Upload Photo	Q26416836

== See also ==
- Grade I listed buildings in Kent
- Grade II* listed buildings in Kent

== Sources ==
- Newman, John (2013) [1969], Kent: North-East and East, The Buildings of England, New Haven and London: Yale University Press, ISBN 978-0-300-18506-5
