= All Saints Church, West Stourmouth =

Coordinates: 51.3203°N 1.2365°E

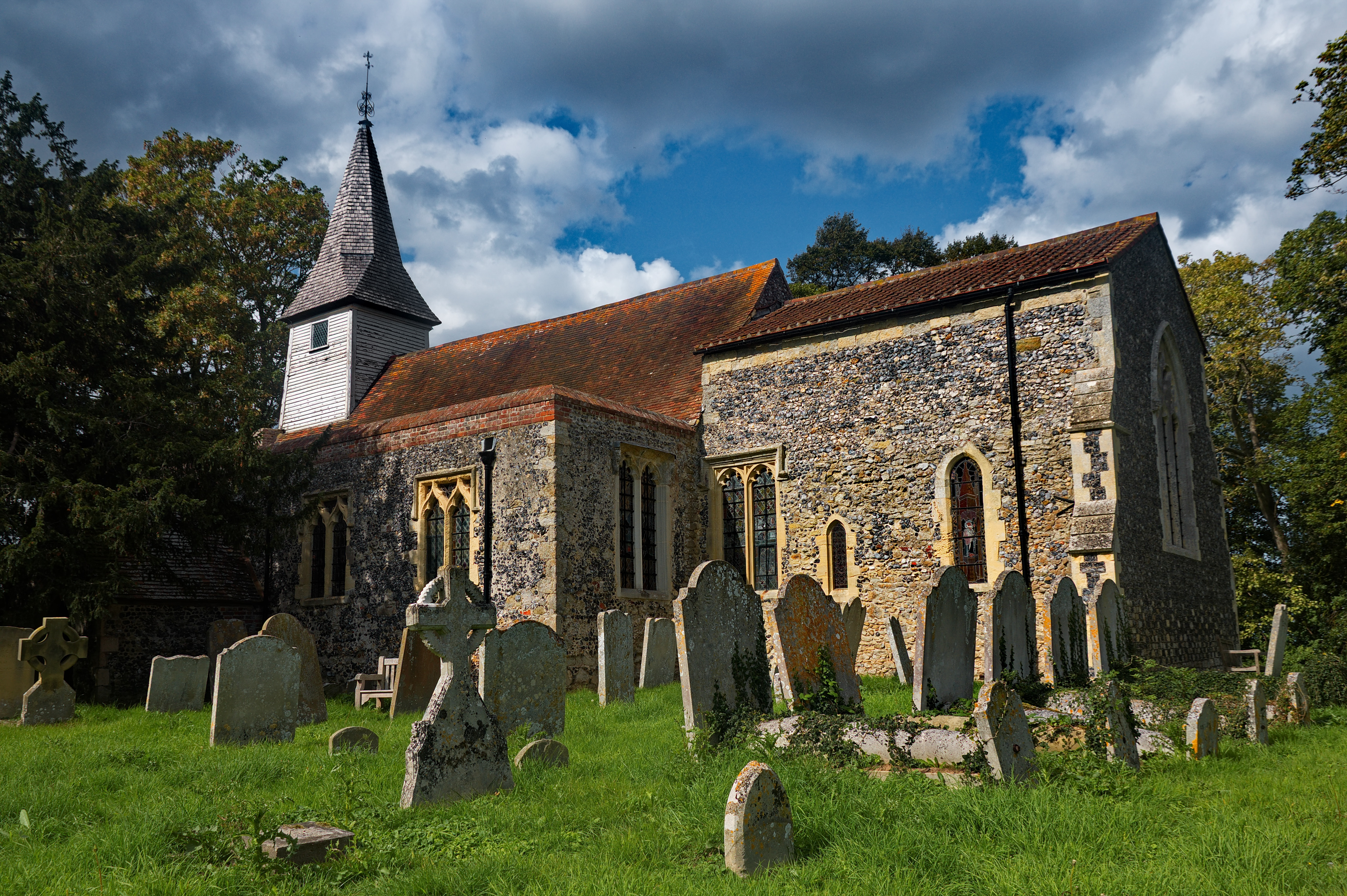
- All Saints Church, West Stourmouth, from the southeast

- Location in Kent
- OS grid reference: TR 256 628
- Location: Stourmouth, Kent
- Country: England
- Denomination: Anglican
- Website: Churches Conservation Trust

History
- Dedication: All Saints

Architecture
- Functional status: Redundant
- Heritage designation: Grade I
- Designated: 11 October 1963
- Architectural type: Church
- Closed: 1979

Specifications
- Materials: Flint with stone dressings, Tiled roofs

All Saints Church, West Stourmouth, is a redundant Anglican church in the civil parish of Stourmouth, Kent, England. It is recorded in the National Heritage List for England as a designated Grade I listed building, and is under the care of the Churches Conservation Trust. The church stands in the settlement of West Stourmouth, some 4 miles (6 km) north of Wingham to the southeast of the A28 road.

== History ==
The main fabric in the church is Anglo-Saxon. Alterations were made in the late 12th century. The church was damaged in an earthquake in 1382, and was subsequently rebuilt. Windows were replaced in the 14th and 15th centuries. The church was restored in 1845, when the seating was reorganised. It has been redundant since 1979.

== Architecture ==
=== Exterior ===
The church is constructed in flint with stone dressings and tiled roofs. Its plan consists of a nave with north and south aisles, a chancel, a south porch, and a west tower. The tower is weatherboarded with a shingled spire, and is supported by two 17th-century massive brick buttresses. Between the buttresses is a porch, above which is a 15th-century two-light window. The south aisle has a brick parapet and contains three two-light ogee-headed 14th-century windows. The south porch is gabled with corner buttresses. The east wall of the chancel was rebuilt in the 19th century, and contains a Decorated style window. In the south wall are two lancet windows, and there is a similar window on the north side. Only the lower half of the north aisle survives, and it contains two hipped dormers.

=== Interior ===
The chancel has dado panelling, a piscina and choir stalls, all dating from the 17th century. The base of a rood screen with four panels is still present. Also dating from the 17th century are an octagonal pulpit and box pews. In the chancel is a brass dated 1472. There are fragments of 15th-century glass in the south window of the chancel. Also in the church are the royal arms of George III.

== Parish Status ==
The church is part of a joint benefice which includes:

- St Nicholas' Church, Ash
- All Saints' Church, Chillenden
- Elmstone Church
- Holy Cross Church, Goodnestone
- St Mildred' Church, Preston

== See also ==
- List of churches preserved by the Churches Conservation Trust in South East England
