= St Mary's Church, Sandwich =

Coordinates: 51.2772°N 1.3387°E

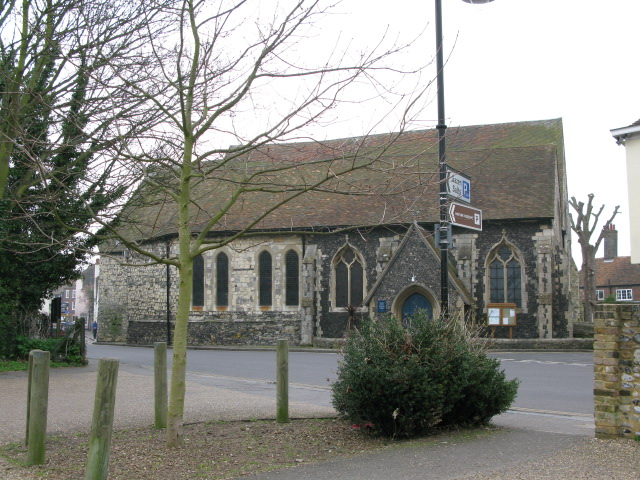
- St Mary's Church, Sandwich, from the north

- Location in Kent
- OS grid reference: TR329584
- Location: Sandwich, Kent
- Country: England
- Denomination: Anglican
- Website: Churches Conservation Trust

Architecture
- Functional status: Redundant
- Heritage designation: Grade I
- Designated: 19 May 1950
- Architect: Joseph Clarke (restoration)
- Architectural type: Church
- Style: Norman, Gothic
- Closed: 1948

Specifications
- Materials: Flint and stone Tiled roofs

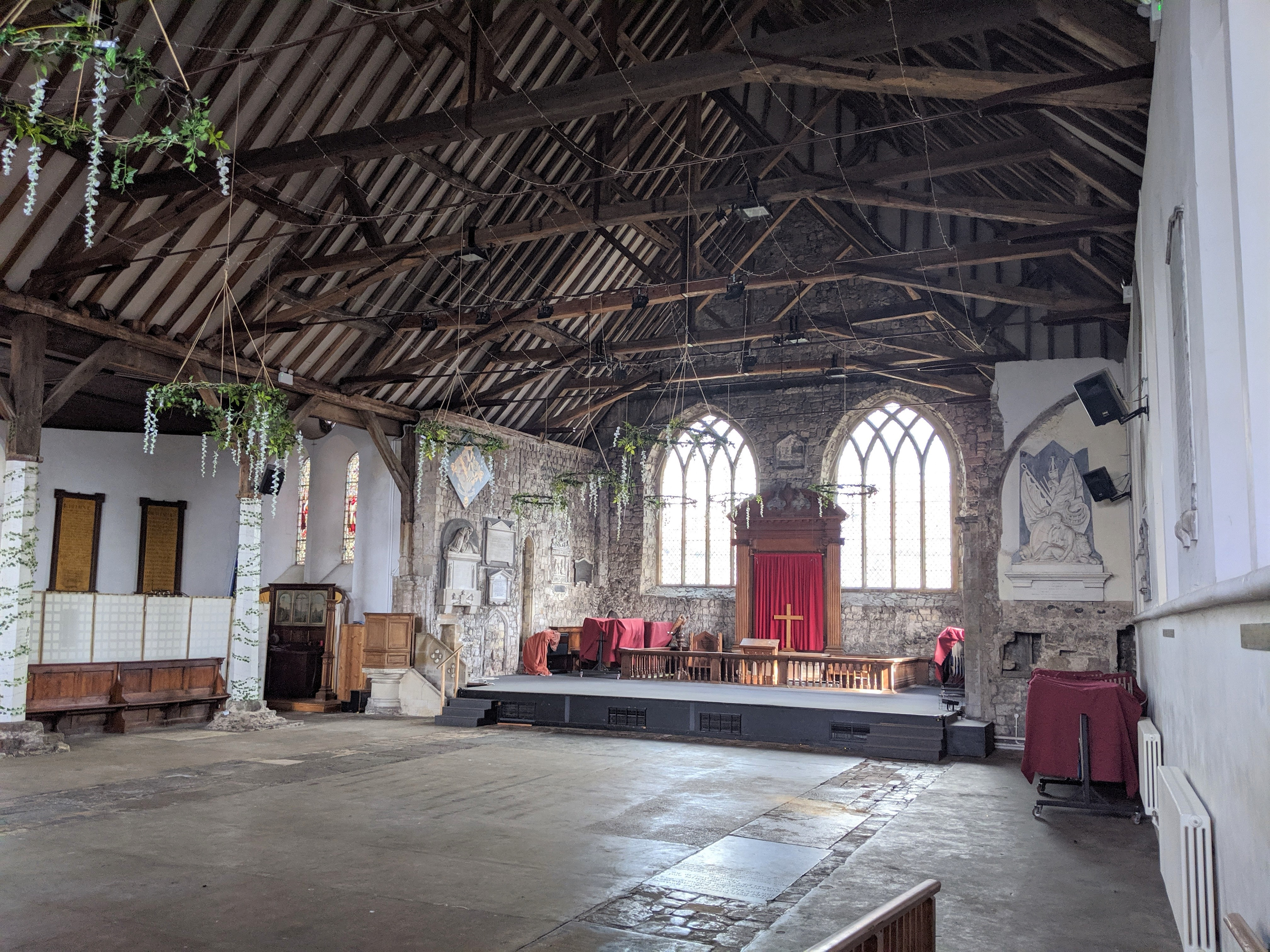
Interior of the church in 2019

St. Mary's Church is a redundant Anglican church in the town of Sandwich, Kent, England. It is recorded in the National Heritage List for England as a designated Grade I listed building, and is under the care of the Churches Conservation Trust. The church is on Strand Street towards the north end of the town.

== Early history ==
St. Mary's stands on the site of a convent established by Domneva in 664–73. This was destroyed by the Danes, and rebuilt by Emma, wife of King Canute. Following the Norman conquest the church was rebuilt again. At this stage it consisted of a nave with north and south aisles, a chancel, a central tower and, possibly, transepts. The chancel was rebuilt in about 1200. The church was damaged by the French in 1217 and again in 1457, and by an earthquake in 1578. In 1667 the central tower collapsed, destroying the nave arcades. It was rebuilt again, with a wide roof covering the nave and the south aisle. In 1714 a belfry was built on the porch, and galleries were added in the middle of the 18th century. The church was restored in 1869–74 by Joseph Clarke.

== Architecture ==
=== Exterior ===
The church is constructed of a variety of materials, mainly flint and stone. The roofs are tiled. Its plan consists of a wide nave and chancel, with a north aisle, and north and south porches. The south porch is in the form of a tower, with a flint lower stage and a brick upper stage. On top of the porch is a small weatherboarded belfry with a pyramidal cap.

=== Interior ===
The north aisle is divided from the nave by a large timber arcade. This replaced the arcade destroyed by the collapse of the tower, and the polygonal timber posts stand on the 14th-century bases of the earlier arcade. The octagonal font is dated 1662, and its bowl is carved with quatrefoils. The 18th-century pulpit is polygonal, standing on a 19th-century base, and was formally part of a three-decker pulpit. The altarpiece is large and consists of a broken pediment on fluted pilasters. It was installed in 1756, and formerly held panels containing the Ten Commandments and the Creed that are now hanging on the north wall. Also on the wall of the church are the Royal Arms of Charles II dated 1660. In the aisle are 18th-century benches moved from Gopsall Hall in 1956. The altar in the aisle was formerly in St Mildred's Church, Canterbury, and the main altar dates from 1956. From the medieval period are niches, an aumbry, and floor tiles. In the north wall is a late-14th-century tomb recess. The memorials include a wall tablet dated 1606, and a wall monument dated 1808 by Westmacott. The stained glass dates from the 19th and 20th centuries. It includes 19th-century windows by Ward and Hughes, and windows in the north aisle dated 1933 by Morris & Co.

== External features ==
The boundary walls of the churchyard have been designated as a Grade II listed building. The walls on the north, west and east sides are constructed in brick, flint and stone, and date from the medieval period and the 17th century. The south wall is of stone and flint, and dates from the Victorian period.

== Recent history and present day ==
In 1948 the parish of St Mary's was combined with two other parishes, and the church became disused. It was planned to demolish the church in 1956, but it was restored and was vested in the Churches Conservation Trust in 1985. Sandwich St. Mary's Community Trust was registered as a charity in 1997, and it works in association with the Friends of St. Mary's to manage the building, to improve its facilities, and to arrange events. The building is used for weddings, concerts, exhibitions, and other events, and is known as St. Mary's Arts Centre. The church is still consecrated and services are occasionally held.

== See also ==
- List of churches preserved by the Churches Conservation Trust in South East England
- St Peter's Church, Sandwich
