= St Benedict's Church, Paddlesworth =

Coordinates: 51.3332°N 0.4170°E

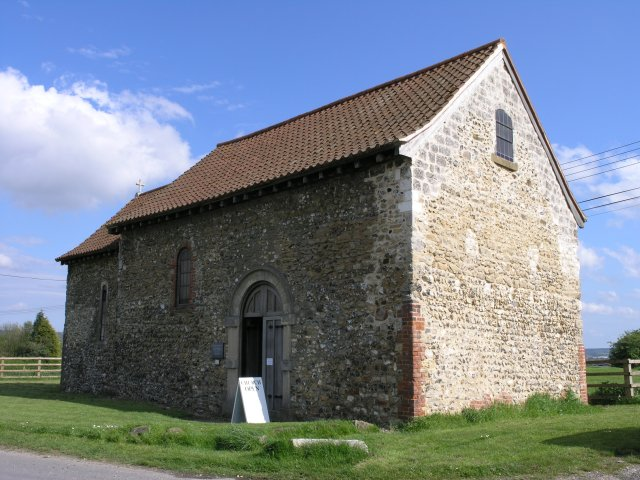
- St Benedict's Church, Paddlesworth, from the northwest

- Location in Kent
- OS grid reference: TQ 684 621
- Location: Paddlesworth, Kent
- Country: England
- Denomination: Anglican
- Website: Churches Conservation Trust

History
- Dedication: Saint Benedict

Architecture
- Functional status: Redundant
- Heritage designation: Grade II*
- Designated: 25 August 1959
- Architectural type: Church
- Style: Norman

Specifications
- Materials: Ragstone rubble Tiled roof

St Benedict's Church is a redundant Anglican church in the village of Paddlesworth, Kent, England. It is recorded in the National Heritage List for England as a designated Grade II* listed building, and is under the care of the Churches Conservation Trust. The church stands on the Pilgrims' Way, about 1 mile (1.6 km) west of Snodland.

== History ==
The church dates from the early part of the 12th century, and was modified during the following century. It closed as a church in 1678, and was then used for some 250 years for non-religious purposes. It is located by a farm, and was used as a farm building. The church was restored in the early 20th century, and again later in the century.

== Architecture ==
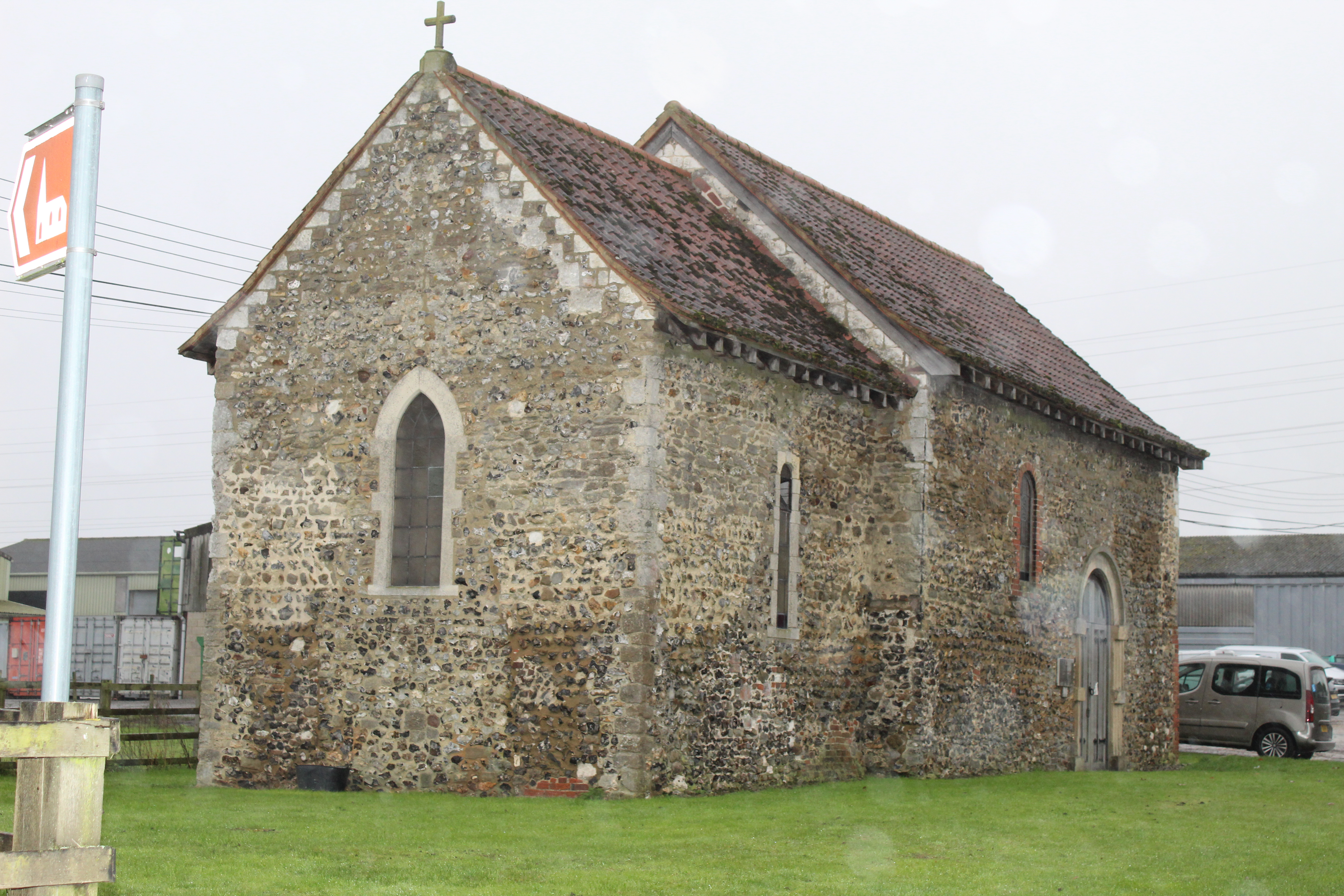
View of the church from the northeastern corner

St Benedict's is constructed in ragstone rubble, and has a tiled roof. Its plan is simple, consisting of two cells, a nave and a chancel. The windows and doors are round-headed. The interior is plain, and it contains a gallery added in the 19th century. Also in the nave is a cast iron candelabrum dating from the late 17th century.

== See also ==
- List of churches preserved by the Churches Conservation Trust in Southeast England
- List of places of worship in Tonbridge and Malling
