= Cleve Hill Solar Park =

Photovoltaic power station in the United Kingdom

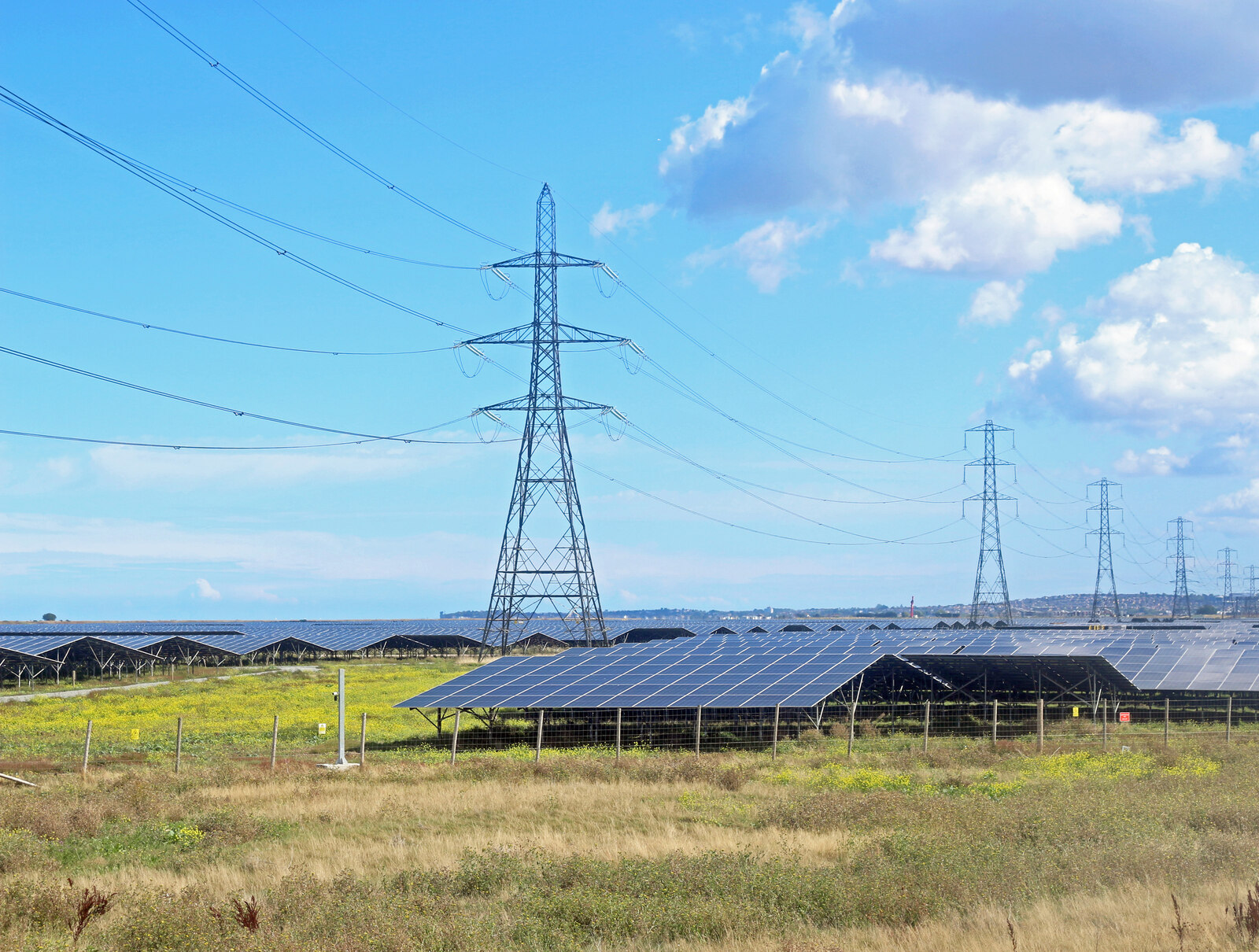
- Country: United Kingdom
- Location: Graveney Marshes
- Coordinates: 51°20′17″N 0°55′08″E
- Status: Operational
- Construction began: April 2023
- Commission date: 1 July 2025
- Construction cost: £450 million (2023)
- Owner: Quinbrook Infrastructure Partners

Solar farm
- Type: Standard PV

Power generation
- Nameplate capacity: 373 MW

External links
- Website: www.clevehillsolar.com

Cleve Hill Solar Park (formerly Project Fortress) is a photovoltaic power station on the Graveney marshes between Faversham and Whitstable, Kent in the UK. It started operations in July 2025.

It is the largest solar farm in the UK, generating 373 MW of electricity from 900 acres (360 ha) of solar panels, and will also include 150 MW (possibly with 700 MWh energy) of battery storage. Because of its size, it is a nationally significant infrastructure project so outside the standard local planning procedure. It is about four times larger than the previously largest solar station.

Electricity is exported from the project via the 400 kV National Grid substation at Cleve Hill, constructed to serve the London Array offshore wind farm in the Thames estuary to the north. A battery array will be placed at the substation, charging from the sunlight during the day and release the energy at night when it is needed.

== History ==
The solar farm was initially developed in partnership by Hive Energy and Wirsol Energy Ltd under the name Cleve Hill Solar Farm. It was acquired by Quinbrook Infrastructure Partners in October 2021 and renamed Project Fortress. The 800 acres (320 ha) of Grade 3b agricultural land (previously converted from salt marsh) and is covered by the fixed-angle east-west facing solar photovoltaic panels.

By 2020, the planning process faced opposition by residents and environmental groups on the grounds of loss of biodiversity resulting from covering large areas with PV panels, and safety, where concerns were raised about a possible fire and explosion of the battery blocks. Participants included the Kent Wildlife Trust, which "engaged fully in the examination process" and helped secure larger buffer zones and management practices; they noted that "some species may even be better off" after the development, which was approved in May 2020.

Construction on the project started in April 2023. A £238.5 million partial funding was achieved in 2025.

== Gallery ==
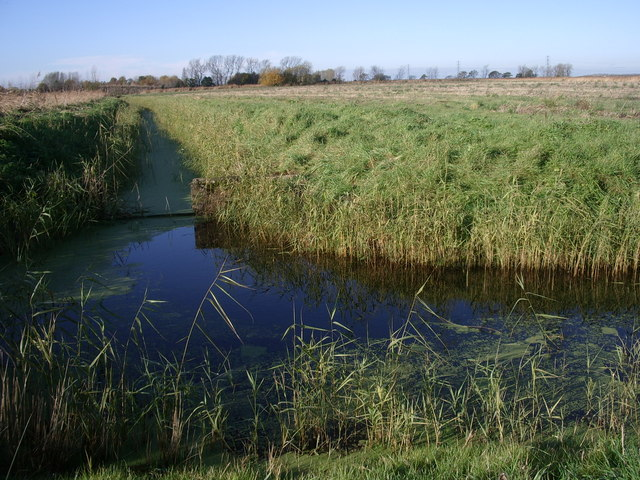
Ditches on the Graveney marsh

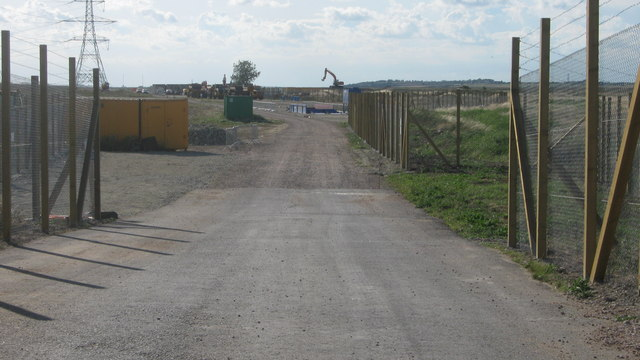
Construction of the sub-station 2009

== See also ==
- Solar power in the United Kingdom
