= St Mary's Church, Luddenham =

Coordinates: 51.3324°N 0.8586°E

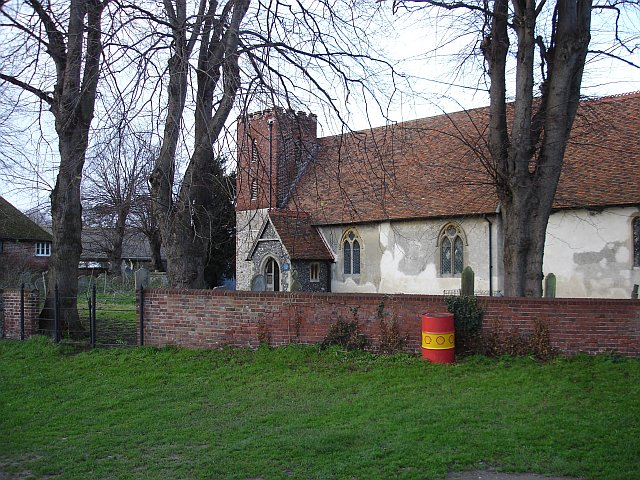
- St Mary's Church, Luddenham, from the southeast

- Location in Kent
- OS grid reference: TQ 992 631
- Location: Luddenham, Kent
- Country: England
- Denomination: Anglican
- Website: Churches Conservation Trust

Architecture
- Functional status: Redundant
- Heritage designation: Grade I
- Designated: 24 January 1967
- Architectural type: Church
- Style: Norman, Gothic

Specifications
- Materials: Flint, partly rendered, and brick Roofs tiled

St Mary's Church is a redundant Anglican church in the village of Luddenham, Kent, England. It is recorded in the National Heritage List for England as a designated Grade I listed building, and is under the care of the Churches Conservation Trust. The church stands in a farmyard some 2 miles (3.2 km) northwest of Faversham.

== History ==
The church dates from the 12th century, and the chancel was added during the following century. The tower was rebuilt in 1807, the church was restored in 1881–84, and the porch was added in 1889. The church was declared redundant on 16 May 1972, and was vested in the Churches Conservation Trust on 1 March 2002. It is open daily to visitors.

== Architecture ==
St Mary's is constructed in flint, some of which has been rendered. It contains some re-used Roman tiles, the upper part of the tower is in brick, and the roofs are tiled. Its plan is simple and consists of a nave with a south porch, a chancel, and a tower in the southwest corner. The lower part of the tower dates from the 12th century, it is built in flint, and its quoins are Roman tiles. The upper part dates from the 1807 rebuilding, it is in brick, and has a battlemented parapet. The west door is Norman and is decorated with zigzags. The windows in the nave are lancets dating from the 14th and 19th centuries. The chancel has paired lancets in the east wall, and two separate lancets in the north wall. Inside the church is a 13th-century coffin lid carved with hands holding a heart.

== External features ==
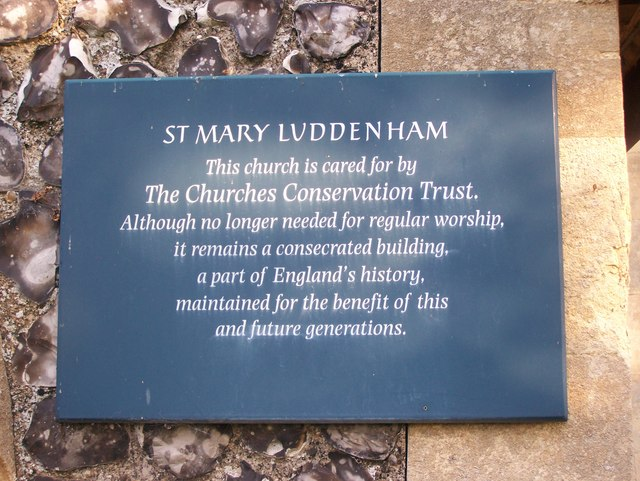

In the churchyard are three structures designated as Grade II listed buildings. To the north of the chancel is a monument dating from the early 19th century. Its inscriptions are illegible. North west of the church is a chest tomb, also dating from the 19th century with illegible inscriptions. Southwest of the church is a pair of headstones dated 1745 and 1747. They are carved with heads, skulls and a Bible, in a heart-shaped surround.

== See also ==
- List of churches preserved by the Churches Conservation Trust in South East England

Media related to St Mary's Church, Luddenham at Wikimedia Commons
