= Graveney =

Village in Kent, England

Coordinates: 51.3279°N 0.9471°E

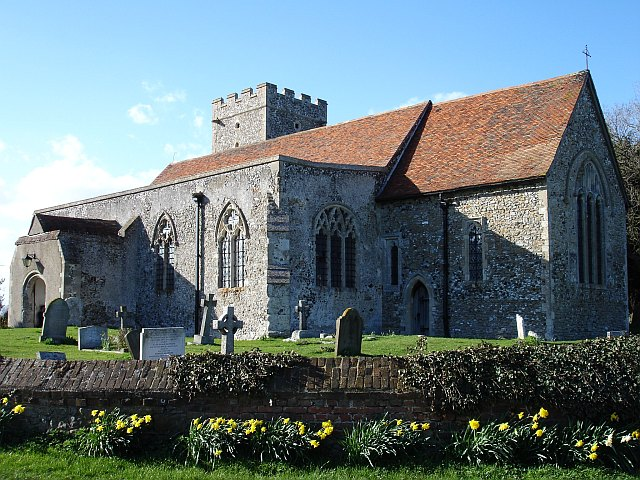
- All Saints Church, Graveney

- Location within Kent
- Population: 490 (2011)
- Civil parish: Graveney with Goodnestone
- District: Swale
- Shire county: Kent
- Region: South East
- Country: England
- Sovereign state: United Kingdom
- Post town: Faversham
- Postcode district: ME13
- Police: Kent
- Fire: Kent
- Ambulance: South East Coast
- UK Parliament: Faversham and Mid Kent

Graveney is a village and former civil parish, now in the parish of Graveney with Goodnestone, in the Swale district, in Kent, England. It is located between Faversham and Whitstable. The main part of the village is located along the intersection of Seasalter Road, Sandbanks Road and Head Hill Road (at the railway crossing), which is surrounded by farmland. The rest of the village is dispersed amongst this farmland. In 1961 the parish had a population of 305.

Features include a local pub ('The Four Horseshoes'), a primary school and a church. There is also a regular bus service that runs through the village.

The Saxon Shore Way (long-distance path) passes around the Graveney Marshes (between Seasalter and Faversham). The marshes are part of the South Swale SSSI.

== History ==
The first records of Graveney are as land acquired in 811 by Wilfred, archbishop of Canterbury, from Cenulph, King of Mercia. Graveney is listed in the Domesday Book in 1086 and was held by the de Gravene and de Feversham families and from 1408 by the Botiller family. Anne Botiller married John Martyn (d.1436) who built the manor house Graveney Court.

On 1 April 1983 the parish was abolished to form "Graveney with Goodnestone".

== Graveney Church ==
All Saints Church, Graveney, was constructed in Norman times, but it is mainly 14th century. The connections between the village of Graveney and the Christian Church can be traced back to a time before the Domesday Survey.

== Graveney boat ==
In 1970, when improvement works were being undertaken by Kent River Authority to drainage channels (Hammond Drain and White Drain) in Graveness, an Anglo-Saxon clinker-built boat was found in the mudflats. The boat was carefully removed by the National Maritime Museum to be conserved and stabilised by the Mary Rose Trust.

It was a cross-channel cargo vessel, reconstructed as some 13.6 m (45 ft) long and 3.4 m (11 ft) wide and 1 m (3 ft 3 in) in draught. Later studies, including dendrochronology determined that it was built from oak, in the mid-890s. It was abandoned in the mud in 950AD. It was also found that one of the last cargoes it carried was hops (vines used in making beer). Other remains include fragments of quern-stones (grinding stones) made from Mayen lava, located in the Rhineland, Germany.

== Graveney marshes ==
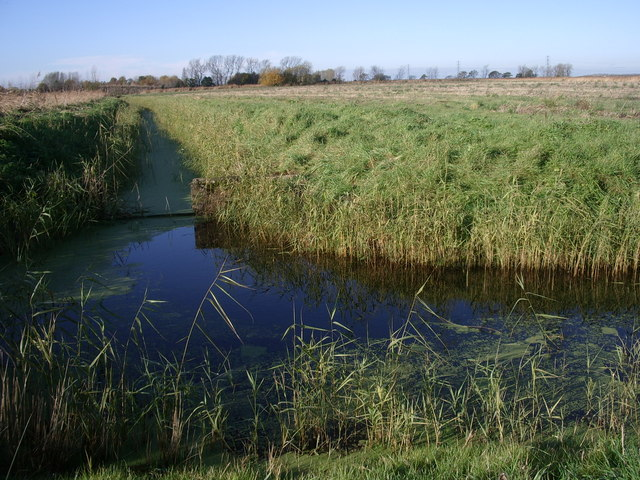
Graveney marshes

Across the marsh run the 400kV powerlines of the national grid They are supported by eight pylons. There is a large 150/400kV electricity substation, serving the London Array offshore wind farm that lies to the north beyond the mouth of the Thames Estuary. Planning permission has been granted to construct a 350MW solar power farm around Cleve Hill, and connect the output to the grid through this substation.

The Battle of Graveney Marsh was the last ground level battle fought on British soil; there were no fatalities and one flesh wound. It was fought on 28 September 1940 and the participants were the crew of Junkers Ju 88 twin-engine bomber that had been forced to crashland and London Irish Rifles who had been billeted in Seasalter. The marshes are the homes to many wildlife species, including lapwing, brent goose, golden plover and marsh harrier.

== See also ==
- Cleve Hill solar farm
- Listed buildings in Graveney with Goodnestone
