= Goodnestone, Swale =

Village in Kent, England

Coordinates: 51.316°N 0.9358°E

Goodnestone
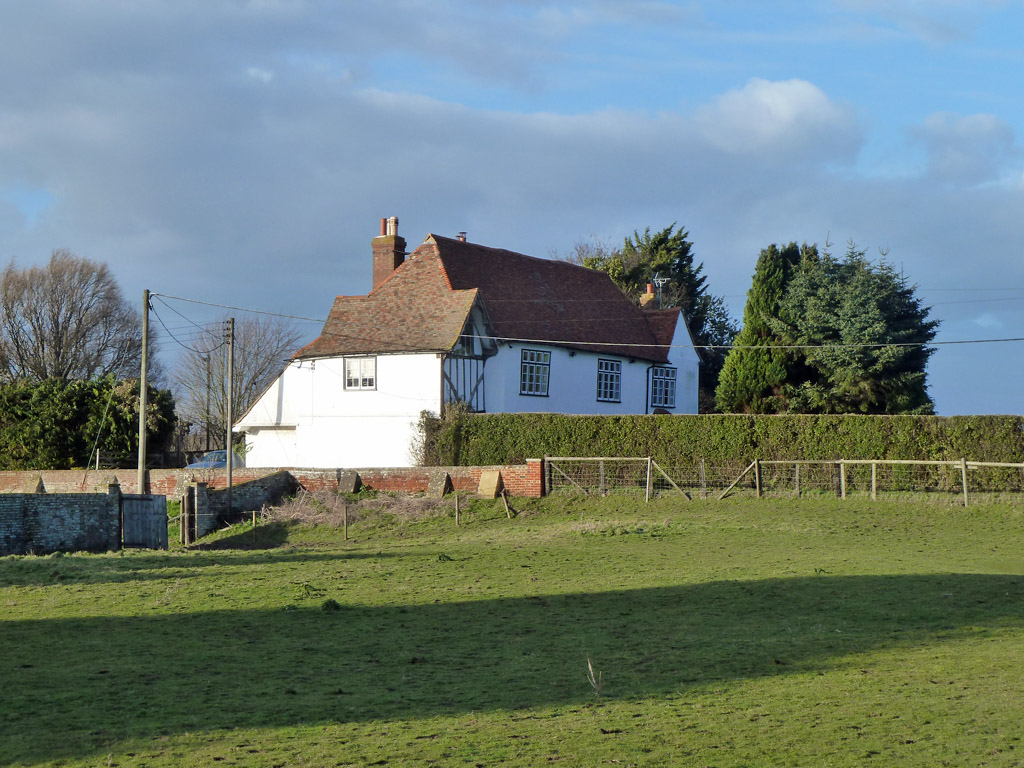
- Goodnestone Court

- Location within Kent
- Population: 490 (2011 Census)
- Civil parish: Graveney with Goodnestone
- District: Swale
- Shire county: Kent
- Region: South East
- Country: England
- Sovereign state: United Kingdom
- Post town: Faversham
- Postcode district: ME13
- Police: Kent
- Fire: Kent
- Ambulance: South East Coast

Goodnestone is a village in the civil parish of Graveney with Goodnestone, in the Swale district of Kent, England. The village is mainly on the road 'Head Hill Road' towards Graveney.

== History ==
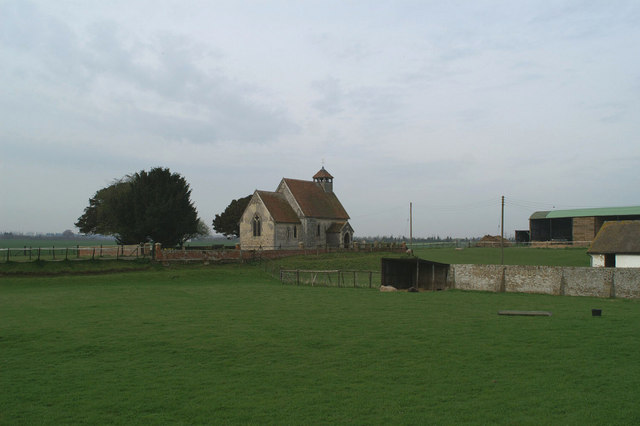
St Bartholomew's Church, Goodnestone

The village was referred to in 1242 as "Godwineston", meaning "the farm or settlement of Godwin". The antiquarian Edward Hasted refers to it in 1798 as 'Goodneston'.

In 1961 the parish had a population of 58. On 1 April 1983 the parish was abolished to form "Graveney with Goodnestone".

St Bartholomew's Church is an unspoilt Grade I listed, Norman church, built about 1100. The church has not been used for regular worship since 1982, but in 1996 it was vested in the Churches Conservation Trust. It was extensively repaired in 1997, and in 2006 it was understood to be still consecrated.

The other Grade II* listed building in the hamlet, is 'Goodnestone Court'.

== See also ==
- Listed buildings in Graveney with Goodnestone
