= Stourmouth =

Civil parish in Kent, England

Coordinates: 51.317°N 1.242°E

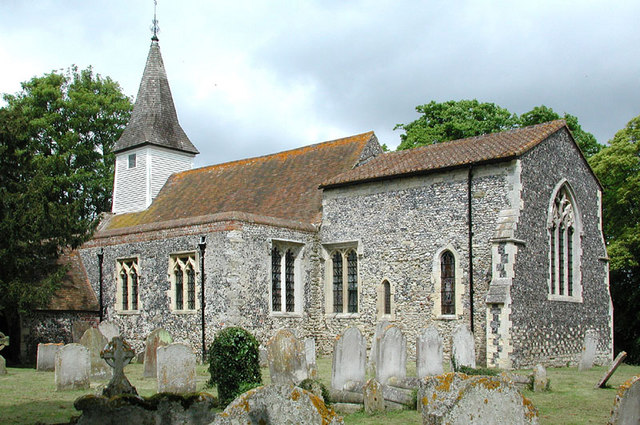
- All Saints Church, West Stourmouth

- Location within Kent
- Population: 268 (2011 Census. Including Plucks Gutter)
- District: Dover
- Shire county: Kent
- Region: South East
- Country: England
- Sovereign state: United Kingdom
- Post town: Canterbury
- Postcode district: CT3
- Police: Kent
- Fire: Kent
- Ambulance: South East Coast

Stourmouth is a civil parish in the Dover non-metropolitan district of Kent, England. The parish contains the settlements of East and West Stourmouth, and the hamlet of Plucks Gutter.

The 'Stourmouth' name derives from a village that was at the mouth of the River Stour before the Wantsum Channel was cut off from the sea.

East Stourmouth is the main population centre, on the B2048 road that bridges the River Stour at Plucks Gutter. It is referred to as 'Stourmouth' on road signs. It has no church, nor any public buildings. The Rising Sun public house was built in 1372 as a bakery, and is today used as the parish polling station for elections. Until the 1970s there was a village post office and bakery.

West Stourmouth village is the site of the parish church which dates to Saxon times, but other than a vicarage, West Stourmouth consists of a few scattered farms.

== See also ==
- All Saints Church, West Stourmouth
- Listed buildings in Stourmouth
