= Luddenham, Kent =

Village in Kent, England

Coordinates: 51.3325°N 0.8593°E

Luddenham
- Location within Kent
- District: Swale
- Shire county: Kent
- Region: South East
- Country: England
- Sovereign state: United Kingdom
- Post town: Faversham
- Postcode district: ME13
- Police: Kent
- Fire: Kent
- Ambulance: South East Coast
- UK Parliament: Sittingbourne and Sheppey

Luddenham is a widespread hamlet or small village north-west of Faversham in Kent, England, with many long-distance views across the Swale and the Isle of Sheppey. It is on the edge of Luddenham Marshes and is also home of Luddenham School. Oare Gunpowder Works are on the edge of the village. It had, according to Edward Hasted in 1798, 396 acres of low flat arable land and 200 acres of meadow and pasture, although half of those are marsh. It is in the civil parish of Norton, Buckland and Stone.

It was once called Cildresham, at the time of the Domesday survey in 1086.

The Manor of Cildresham belonged to Odo, Earl of Kent, (as the Bishop of Bayeux) and was noted so in the Domesday Book. After Odo's trial for fraud, the manor then passed to the Fulbert de Dover (of Chilham) who helped the King defend Dover Castle.

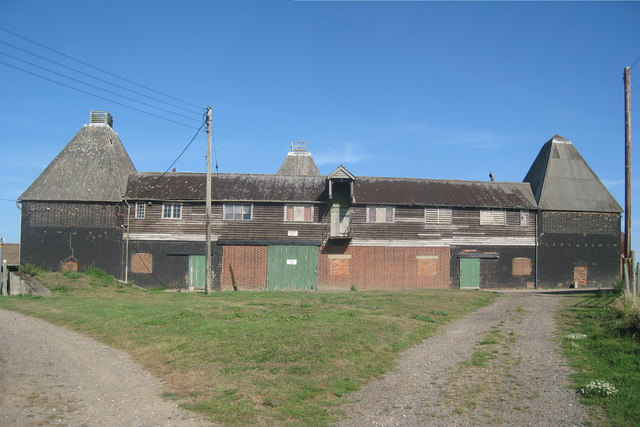
Luddenham Court Farm

Then William de Luddenham became owner the Manor of Luddenham in 1212 and during the reign of Henry III, it passed to Sir Roger de Northwood.

It has the Grade I listed Church of St Mary, beside the Grade II listed Luddenham Court (built in the 15th century).

Also within the scattered hamlet, is the Nash estate which includes the grade II listed Nash's Farmhouse.

It used to have one of the most remote public houses in the area, The Mounted Rifleman, which closed in the early 1990s.

== See also ==
- St Mary's Church, Luddenham
- Hyde v Wrench (1840) 3 Beav 334, an English contract law case, about the sale of a Luddenham farm.
- Listed buildings in Luddenham, Kent
