= Waldershare =

Village in Kent, England

Coordinates: 51.19°N 1.26°E

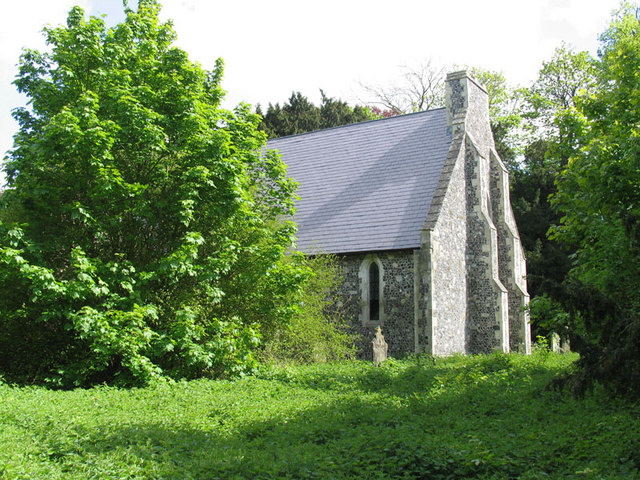
- All Saints Church

- Location within Kent
- OS grid reference: TR2948
- Civil parish: Tilmanstone
- District: Dover
- Shire county: Kent
- Region: South East
- Country: England
- Sovereign state: United Kingdom
- Post town: Dover
- Postcode district: CT15
- Police: Kent
- Fire: Kent
- Ambulance: South East Coast

Waldershare is a village in the civil parish of Tilmanstone, in the Dover district, in Kent, England, near Dover. It has a church called All Saints Church.

== History ==
The name "Waldershare" means 'District of the forest-dwellers'. Waldershare was recorded in the Domesday Book as Walwalesere. In 1086, the village was in the hundred of Eastry in the ancient Lathe of Eastry. By 1295 the ancient lathe had been merged into the Lathe of St. Augustine. In the 18th century, the noble family of Waldershare were lords of a manor in the parish of Shebbertswell. In 1931 the parish had a population of 109. On 1 April 1935 the parish was abolished and merged with Tilmanstone and Ripple.
