= Romney Deanery =

Anglican Deanery in Kent, England

The Romney Deanery is in the Diocese of Canterbury in Kent, England.

Churches within the Deanery:

Church Name	Location	Current Incumbent
St Martin	Aldington	
St Peter and St Paul	Appledore	Tricia Fogden
St Peter and St Paul	Bilsington	Roger Martin
St Rumwold	Bonnington	Roger Martin
St Eanswith's	Brenzett	Keith Fazzani
St Augustines	Brookland	Shuna Body
All Saints	Burmarsh	Jim Field
The Sanctuary	Dungeness	Sarah Williams, Lydia Terry
St Peter and St Paul	Dymchurch	Jim Field, Peter Snare
St Mary the Virgin	Ebony	Judy Darkins
St Thomas	Fairfield	Shuna Body
St Peter	Greatstone	Sarah Williams, Lydia Terry
Church of The Good Shepherd	Hamstreet	Rod Whately, Patricia Fogden
St George	Ivychurch	Jim Field
St Mary	Kenardington	Rod Whately, Patricia Fogden
All Saints	Lydd	Sarah Williams, Lydia Terry
St Stephen	Lympne	Richard Love
St Nicholas	New Romney	Jim Field
St Peter & St Paul	Newchurch	Jim Field
St Clement	Old Romney	Jim Field
St Mary	Orlestone	Rod Whately, Patricia Fogden
St Mary Magdalene	Ruckinge	Rod Whately, Patricia Fogden
St Dunstan	Snargate	Keith Fazzani
Snave Church	Snave	Rod Whately, Patricia Fogden
St Mary the Virgin	St Mary in the Marsh	Jim Field
All Saints	St Mary's Bay	Jim Field
St Mary the Virgin	Stone	Tricia Fogden
St Matthew	Warehorne	Rod Whately, Patricia Fogden
St John the Baptist	Wittersham	Judy Darkins
All Saints	Woodchurch	Sue Wharton
