= William Richard Cosway =

British naval administrator and Kent landowner (1783–1834)

Sir William Richard Cosway
- Born: baptised 17 October 1783; Stoke Damerel, Devon, England
- Died: 7 June 1834 near Shooter's Hill, London, England
- Burial place: St Martin-in-the-Fields, London
- Occupations: Naval administrator; landowner
- Known for: Secretary to Cuthbert Collingwood, 1st Baron Collingwood
- Spouse: Elizabeth Harvie Halliday
- Children: Georgina Halliday Cosway; Elizabeth Sophia Cosway; William Halliday Cosway; Helen Glenthorne Cosway; Marion Turner Cosway

Sir William Richard Cosway (baptised 17 October 1783 – 7 June 1834) was a British naval administrator and Kent landowner who served as private secretary to the Royal Navy commander Cuthbert Collingwood, 1st Baron Collingwood during the Napoleonic Wars. His career placed him within the command structure of the British fleet during the era of Horatio Nelson and the Battle of Trafalgar in 1805.

In later life he settled at Bilsington in Kent, where he lived at Bilsington Priory, became involved in Reform-era politics, and was commemorated after his death by the construction of the Cosway Monument near the village.

== Early life and family ==
Cosway was born in the parish of Stoke Damerel, near the naval dockyard town of Devonport in Devon. He was the son of Benjamin Cosway, a baker, and Mary Cosway, and was baptised there on 17 October 1783.

Through his family he was related to the portrait miniaturist Richard Cosway, whom later writers described as his second cousin. Richard Cosway was one of the most celebrated portrait painters of late eighteenth-century Britain and a member of the Royal Academy of Arts. Sir William Cosway is recorded as possessing several works by his cousin, reflecting the continuing family connection between the naval administrator and the prominent artist.

== Career ==
Cosway began his career in naval administration at the dockyard town of Devonport, where he worked in the Victualling Office connected with the Royal Navy dockyard. The Victualling Office was responsible for supplying provisions to the fleet, and employment there often served as an entry point into naval administrative service.

In December 1800 Cosway was appointed private secretary to Cuthbert Collingwood, 1st Baron Collingwood, one of the most distinguished officers of the Royal Navy during the French Revolutionary Wars and Napoleonic Wars. The role placed him in a position of considerable trust, responsible for managing the admiral’s correspondence, preparing dispatches for the Admiralty, and assisting in the administrative organisation of the fleet.

Cosway served with Collingwood during the campaign culminating in the Battle of Trafalgar on 21 October 1805. During the battle Collingwood commanded the lee column of the British fleet aboard HMS Royal Sovereign. Cosway was attached to the admiral’s staff and present with the fleet during the engagement.

According to a contemporary obituary, Cosway sustained a head injury during the Trafalgar campaign. Despite this, he continued to serve in Collingwood’s administration during the subsequent Mediterranean command of the British fleet.

Collingwood’s correspondence suggests that he held Cosway in high regard. In one letter the admiral remarked that Cosway was “of more use to me than any officer after Clavell,” referring to his flag lieutenant.

Cosway remained attached to Collingwood’s staff for the remainder of the admiral’s career, assisting with the extensive administrative responsibilities involved in directing the Mediterranean fleet after Trafalgar. He continued in this capacity until Collingwood’s death in 1810 while returning to Britain from his command.

== Personal life ==
During his service as private secretary to Cuthbert Collingwood, 1st Baron Collingwood, Cosway became closely connected with the admiral’s family. According to contemporary accounts, he formed an attachment to one of Collingwood’s daughters and the two were expected to marry. The engagement did not proceed after Cosway suffered a serious accident which left him badly injured.

Cosway later married Elizabeth Harvie Halliday on 23 October 1823 at St Marylebone Parish Church.

She was the daughter of Simon Halliday, a banker of Lower Berkeley Street in London.

Their children included:

- Georgina Halliday Cosway (1826–1854)
- Elizabeth Sophia Cosway (born 1826)
- William Halliday Cosway (1828–1898)
- Helen Glenthorne Cosway (1829–1918)
- Marion Turner Cosway (1832–1900)

Their only son, William Halliday Cosway, later adopted the surname Halliday. In 1860 he married Maria Farquhar, daughter of Sir Thomas Harvie Farquhar, 1st Baronet, at St Clement Danes.

== Philanthropy and political life ==
Cosway later resided at Bilsington Priory near the village of Bilsington in Kent. Local accounts describe him as a benefactor to the community who supported the establishment of a village school and assisted local families in need. He was also associated with helping villagers emigrate to America during the early nineteenth century.

Cosway also became active in local political life during the period surrounding the Reform Act 1832. He supported Reform politics in east Kent and became involved in electoral disputes connected with the parliamentary borough of Maidstone.

In the course of these disputes Cosway publicly challenged the political influence of Sir Edward Knatchbull, 9th Baronet, one of the leading Conservative figures in Kent and a prominent opponent of Reform. The dispute attracted local attention and formed part of the wider political tensions that followed the Reform Act.

In 1833 proceedings were brought in the Court of King's Bench after Cosway published an article in the Kent Herald criticising the conduct of certain Kent magistrates in a dispute involving recovered stolen property. The magistrates sought a criminal information for libel, but the court refused the application.

A later account suggested that Cosway may have benefited financially from circumstances following the Battle of Trafalgar. A letter published in the Evening Mail in 1849 claimed that property which might otherwise have gone to the family of John Scott, secretary to Horatio Nelson who was killed during the battle, instead passed to Cosway, who was serving as secretary to Cuthbert Collingwood, 1st Baron Collingwood. Because this claim appeared many years after the event, it has not been independently confirmed in official records.

== Death and widow ==
Cosway died on 7 June 1834, aged fifty.

Contemporary reports stated that he was killed when a coach travelling between London and Brighton overturned near Shooter's Hill, throwing him from the vehicle.

He was buried at St Martin-in-the-Fields in London.

Following his death, supporters organised a public subscription among Reformers in East Kent to erect a memorial in his honour. The resulting Cosway Monument was built near Bilsington around 1835.

His widow, Lady Elizabeth Cosway, survived him by more than forty years. She died on 26 July 1876 at Norfolk House, Queen's Road, West Cowes, Isle of Wight, aged seventy-nine.

== Bilsington monument ==
Following Cosway’s death in 1834, his political supporters organised a public subscription among Reformers in east Kent to erect a memorial in his honour. The resulting monument, commonly known as the Cosway Monument, was constructed near the village of Bilsington and completed in about 1835.

The monument is a tall column constructed of local Kentish ragstone standing on elevated ground overlooking the surrounding countryside near Bilsington Priory, the residence associated with Cosway during his later life. It commemorates him both as secretary to Cuthbert Collingwood, 1st Baron Collingwood and as a supporter of Reform politics in Kent.

During the twentieth century the structure fell into a state of disrepair and suffered damage from lightning strikes. A newspaper report in 1967 noted that the monument had been struck by lightning and had deteriorated significantly, prompting concerns about its future preservation.

Restoration work began in the 1990s following growing concern about the monument’s condition. Repairs were carried out with assistance from heritage funding, including support from the National Lottery Heritage Fund.

The Cosway Monument remains a prominent landmark in the Bilsington area and a reminder of Cosway’s association with the Reform movement and the local community.
