= Church of St Thomas à Becket, Fairfield =

Church near Fairfield, Kent

Church of St Thomas à Becket
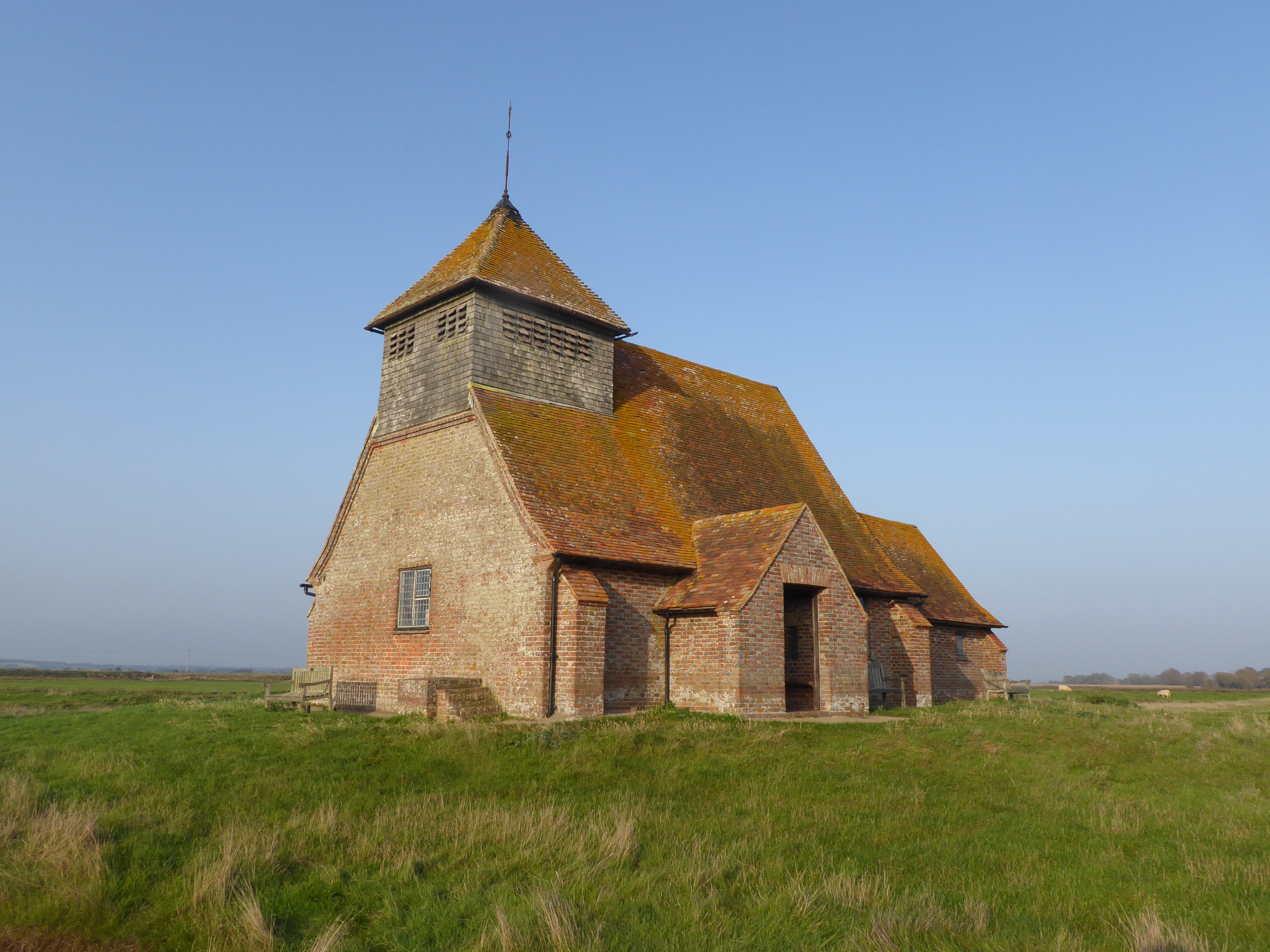
- Church of St Thomas à Becket, Fairfield
- Church of St Thomas à Becket
- 51.0416°N 0.80184°E
- OS grid reference: TQ 96671 26490
- Location: Fairfield, Kent
- Country: England
- Denomination: Anglican

Architecture
- Heritage designation: Grade I

Administration
- Diocese: Canterbury

The Church of St Thomas à Becket is a parish church near the village of Fairfield, Kent, England. Standing in open marshland and accessible only by footpath, it is noted for its remote setting and has been a frequent subject for photographers, writers, and artists. The church was built in the 15th century on the site of an earlier church. It was renovated in the 17th century in accordance with the Laudian plan promoted by Archbishop William Laud, which adapted medieval interiors for Protestant worship. In the 18th century, the exterior walls were rebuilt in brick. By the 19th century, fewer than 24 dwellings remained in Fairfield parish, and by 1934, the parish was dissolved. In the early 20th century, the church underwent a major renovation. Many of the timbers were replaced and the exterior was clad with new brickwork. It is a Grade I listed building.

== Description ==
The small church, located on Romney Marsh near the abandoned village of Fairfield, stands alone in a field surrounded by water-filled ditches. There is no burial ground. In England's Thousand Best Churches, Simon Jenkins calls the church of St Thomas à Becket, "one of the best-known churches in Kent, if only for its evocative isolation. It appears as if deposited by the tide on a mound in Romney Marsh." Until the 20th century, the church could be reached only by boat. Today, it can be reached by footpath.

The present building was originally framed in timber, the walls were constructed with wattle and daub. The layout of the building consists of a nave, small chancel, tower and south porch. The chancel has two timber-framed bays, A wood-shingled bell turret is situated at the west end of the nave and has a pyramid-shaped roof. The nave and chancel's roofs are gabled. The exterior is covered with alternating red and grey brick. The building's rectangular casement windows are leaded. An east window in the chancel contains early 20th century stained glass. The doors to the porch are blocked. A single crown-post supports the roofs of both the nave and the chapel.

Furnishings include a 15th–16th century heptagonal font constructed with Kentish ragstone. A small altar table in the chancel is surrounded by railing with surrounding benches.Altar rails have early 18th century balusters and a simple handrail. Rows of 18th-century box pews, painted white, fill the nave and south end of the chancel. The elevated pulpit is three-decker and the only surviving pulpit of that design in Kent. There are several oval text boards in the nave.

St Thomas à Becket is one of the best-known churches on Romney Marsh and has inspired many artists, photographers, and writers. Artist John Piper used the white panelling and black furnishings of Fairfield Church as inspiration for the prayer room at Nuffield College, Oxford. The church has also appeared in film adaptations of Charles Dickens' Great Expectations.

== History ==
A church has been on this site since the 13th century. It was dedicated to St Thomas à Becket, Archbishop of Canterbury. The present structure was built in the 15th century. The church was renovated in the 17th century with the Laudian plan layout promoted by Archbishop William Laud. Its objective was to accommodate the medieval floor plan for Protestant worship. Features include a nave fitted with pews for the congregation, a three-decker pulpit, and chancel at the east end enclosed by rails.

The building was restored in the 18th century, when its walls were rebuilt in brick and the roof covered with red tiles. In 1912–1913, the church, then in disrepair, was extensively renovated under architect W. D. Caröe. The church was rebuilt and many of the timbers replaced. The exterior was clad with new brickwork. Most of the original timber work remains in the roof frame. The church's interior remained untouched. During this period, a watercourse and causeway were constructed to provide access to the church.

By the 19th century, few dwellings remained in Fairfield parish. Fairfield village has been deserted since the early 1930s. The church has survived intact and is now part of the civil parish which includes the villages of Brookland, Brenzett and Snargate. It was designated a Grade I listed building in 1957.

== In popular culture ==
The church has featured in the 2012 film Great Expectations and television shows including Great Expectations (2011), and Parade's End (2012).

== Gallery ==
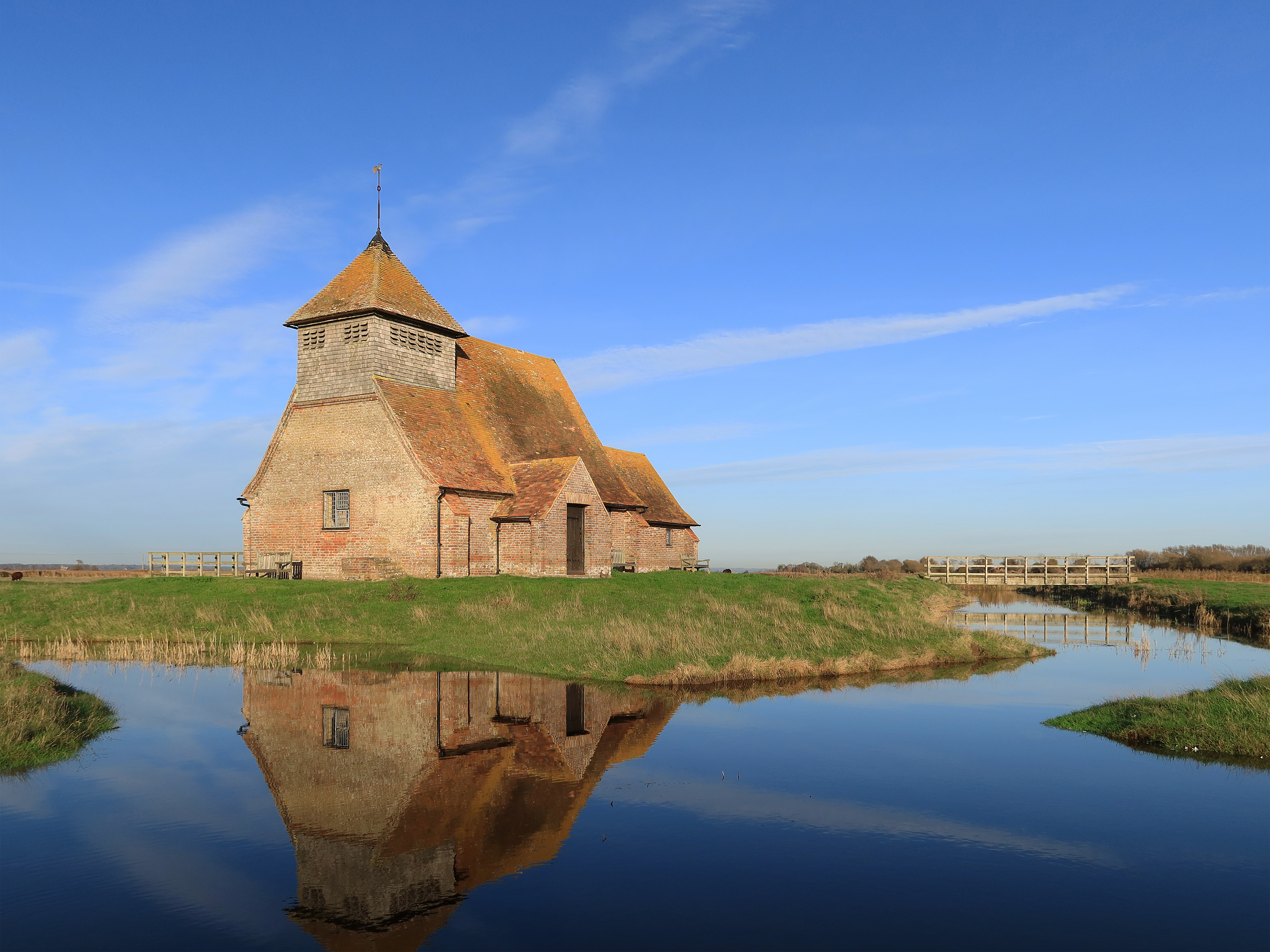
Exterior view

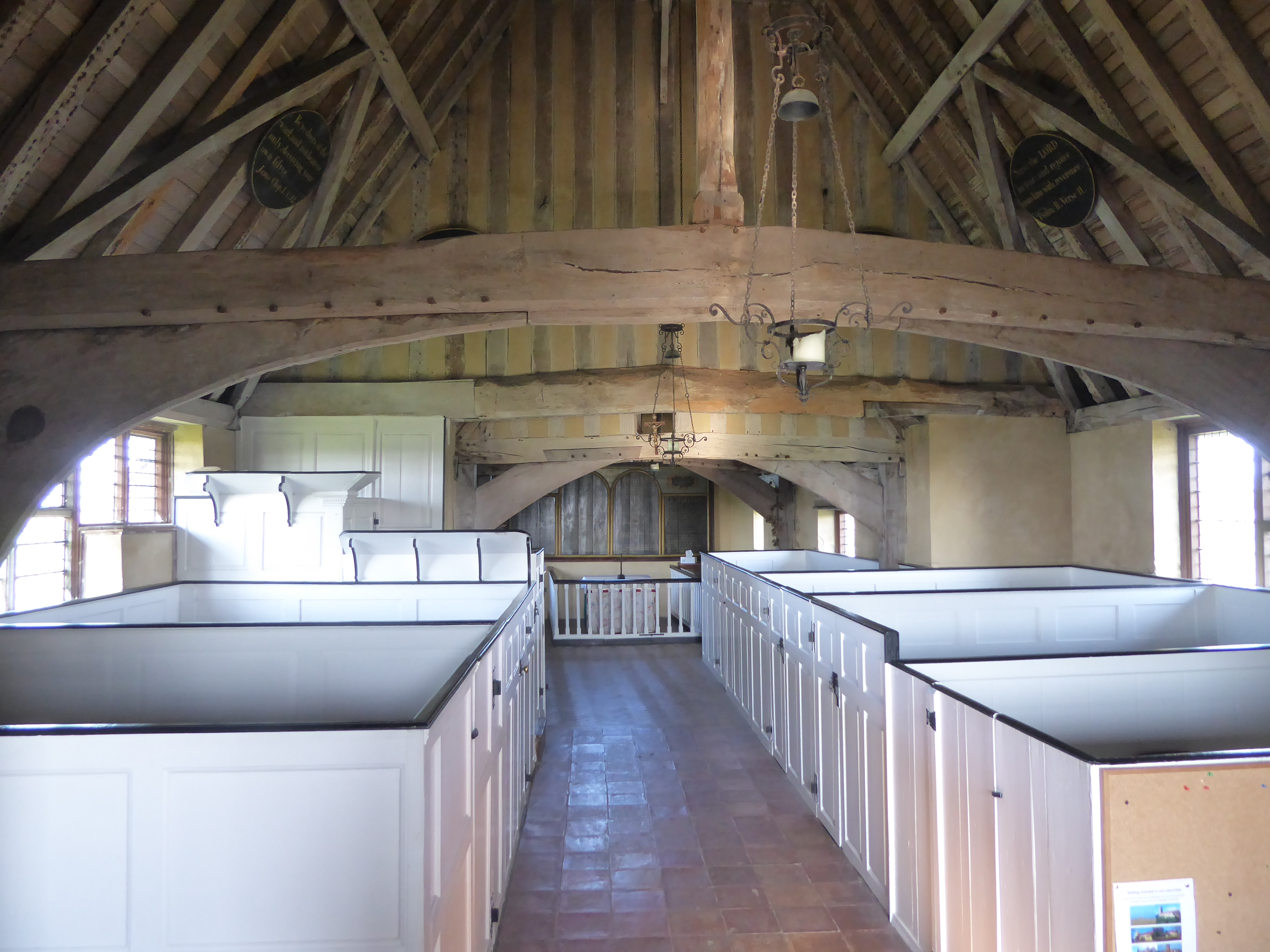
Interior, box pews

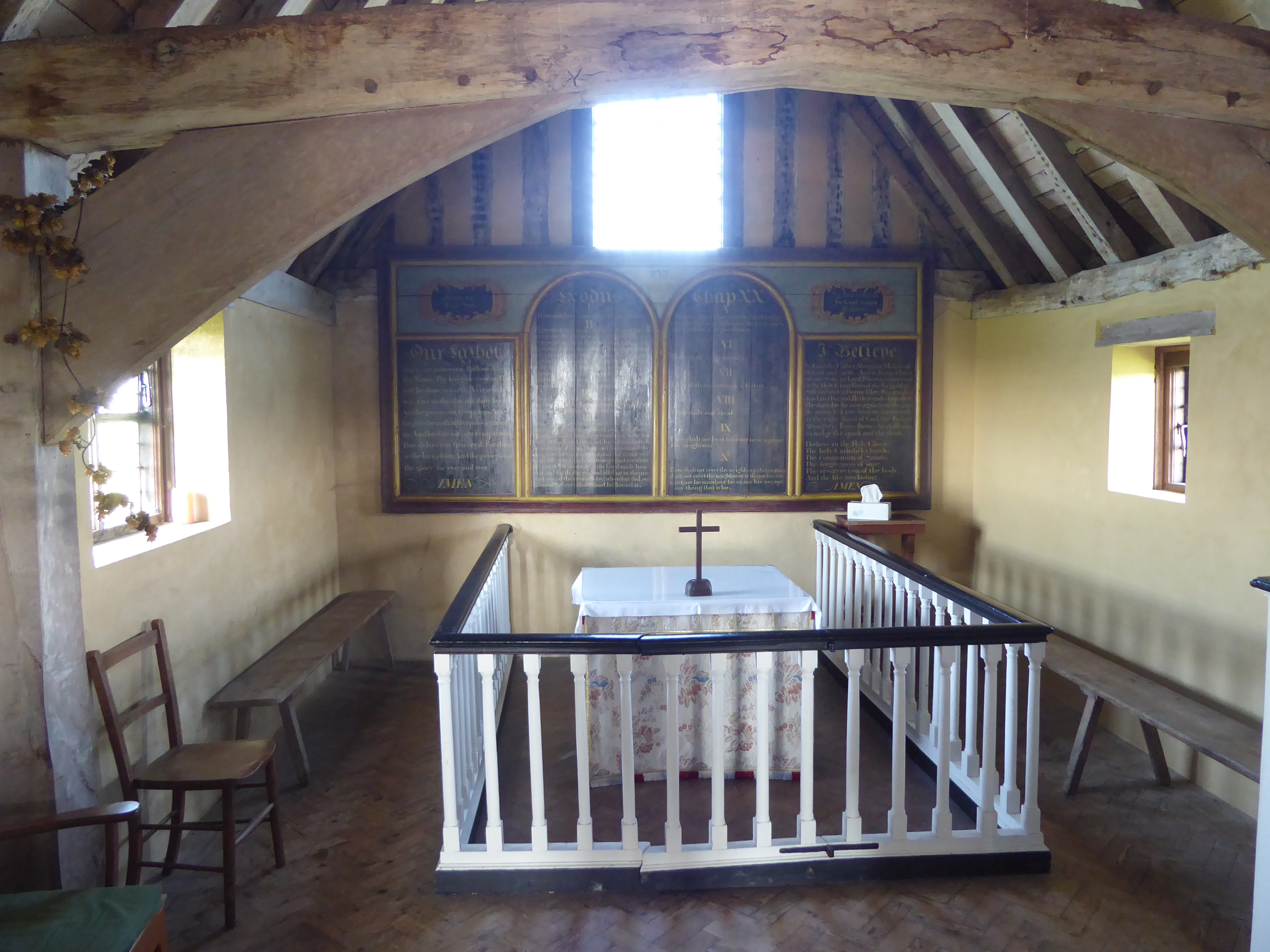
Interior, chancel

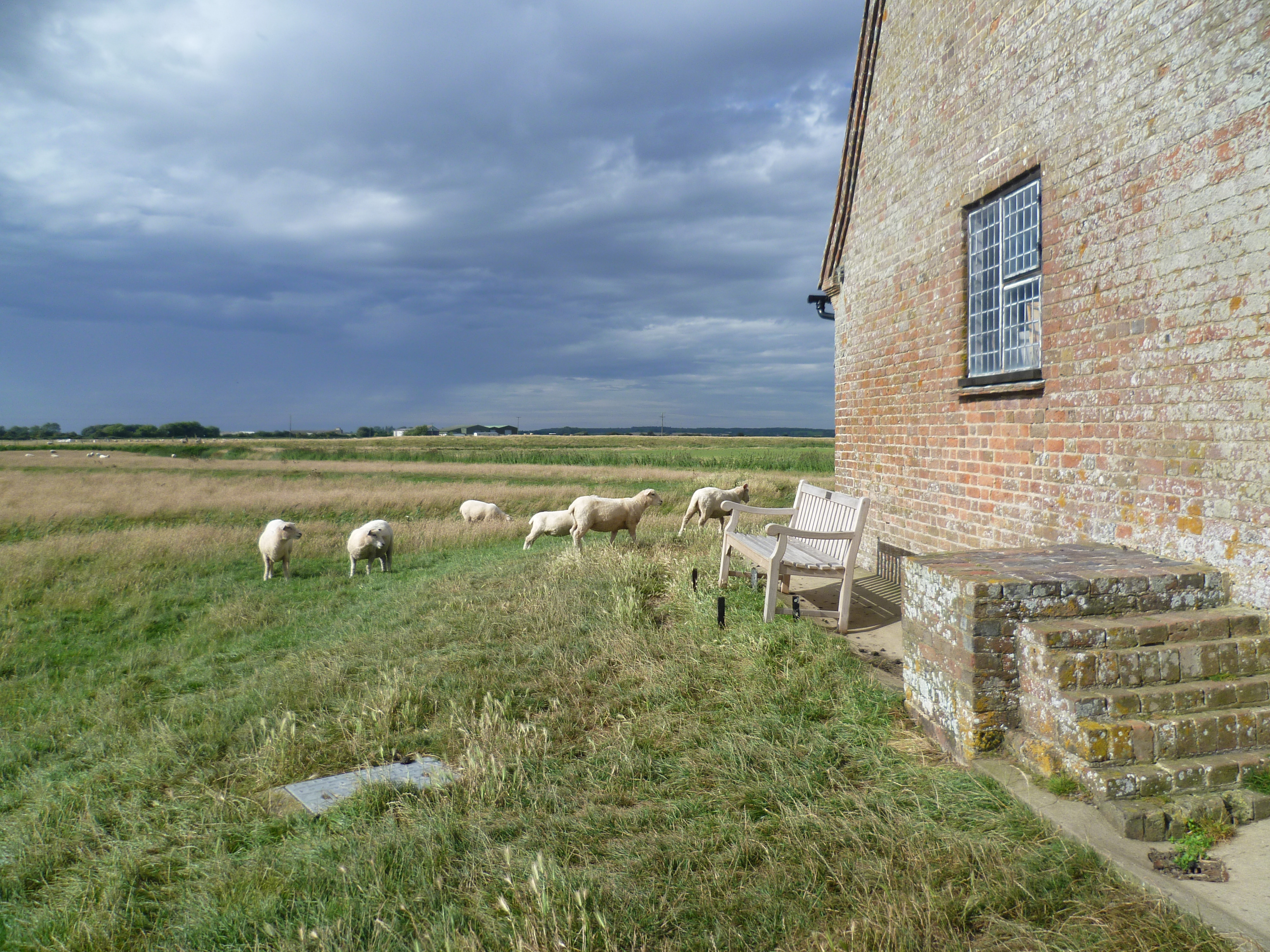
Mounting block

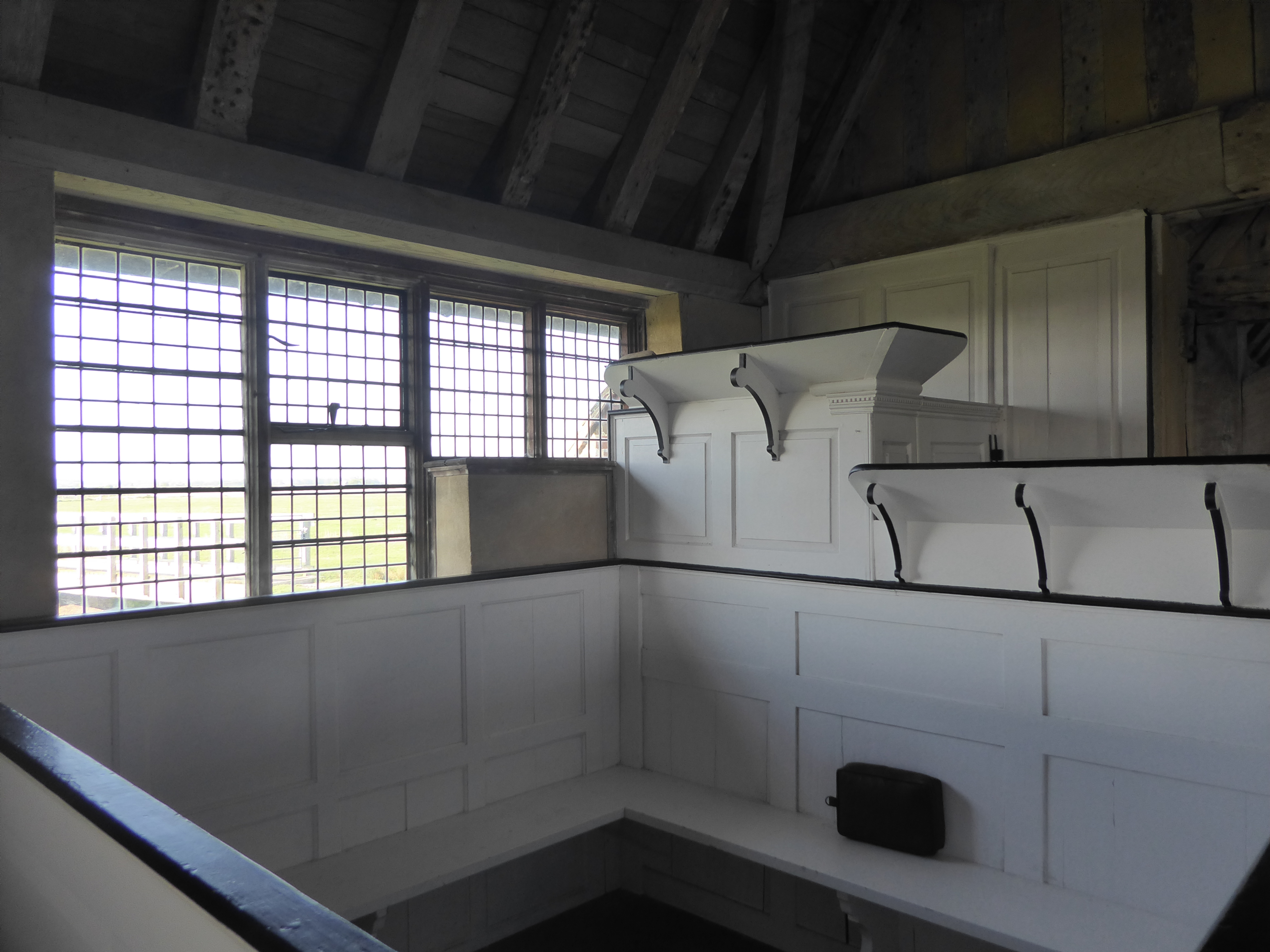
Pulpit

== See also ==
- Grade I listed buildings in Folkestone and Hythe
