= Red Lion, Snargate =

Listed pub in Kent, England

Red Lion
- The pub in 2011
- Former names: Shepherd & Lamb

General information
- Type: Public house
- Location: Snargate, Kent, England
- Coordinates: 51.021900°N 0.836528°E
- Year built: 18th century (or earlier)
- Renovated: 19th century (façade)
- Owner: Independent

Design and construction
- Designations

Listed Building – Grade II
- Official name: The Red Lion public house
- Designated: 23 April 1985
- Reference no.: 1277477

The Red Lion is a Grade II listed public house in Snargate, a village in Kent, England. While the present frontage dates from the 19th century, parts of the structure are 18th century or earlier. The pub has been associated with the Jemison family since 1911. The building is noted for its well-preserved interior and is included on the Campaign for Real Ale (CAMRA)'s National Inventory of Historic Pub Interiors, where it is rated three stars and regarded as being of "outstanding national historic importance".

== History ==
The building comprises a public house, former shop and attached outbuildings. While the present frontage dates from the 19th century, parts of the building are 18th century or earlier. The pub has been associated with the Jemison family since 1911, marking more than a century of continuous family ownership. Local tradition also links the pub with smuggling activity on Romney Marsh, with contraband said to have been stored in the tower of the neighbouring St Dunstan's Church.

The pub originally comprised two separate rooms: a public bar and a tap room. Following the Second World War, the tap room was converted into a shop, a use it retained until 1974. In the early 1980s, the room was returned to pub use and became a venue for traditional pub games. The building is noted for the survival of traditional features and has changed little since the mid-20th century.

On 23 April 1985, the Red Lion was designated a Grade II listed building. It was included on the Campaign for Real Ale (CAMRA)'s National Inventory of Historic Pub Interiors before the inventory's grading system was revised. Under the revised scheme, it is rated three stars and its interior is regarded as being "of outstanding national historic importance". It has also been a continuous entry in the Good Beer Guide for more than 40 years.

== Architecture ==
=== Exterior ===
Built of white-painted stucco at the front and red brick to the rear, the building has tiled roofs and several chimney stacks. It is arranged in two parallel ranges, with two bars occupying the left-hand side and extending through both parts of the building, while a further bar occupies the former shop on the right. The main frontage has two storeys and a hipped roof, with a symmetrical three-bay appearance. Entrances are located in the centre and at the right-hand end, both retaining panelled doors. The windows are traditional sashes arranged regularly across the façade. Single-storey outbuildings are attached on either side, while the rear range has varied roof forms, including a half-hipped section.

=== Interior ===
The front part of the bar on the left is lined with full-height timber panelling, while the rear section has panelling to the lower walls. The bar itself has a panelled front, a white marble counter top and four hand pumps set within a pewter surround. The pumps date from the 19th century and are no longer in use. Fixed bench seating survives beneath the windows. A timber-and-glass screen separates the front and rear bar areas; beyond it is a small room formerly used as living accommodation. A panelled corridor leads to the former shop on the right, which retains a serving hatch in the doorway and fixed seating beneath the window. After serving as a shop following the Second World War, the room was later returned to use as a public room and is associated with traditional pub games such as toad in the hole and table skittles.
