= Newchurch, Kent =

Village in Kent, England

Coordinates: 51.045°N 0.93°E

Newchurch
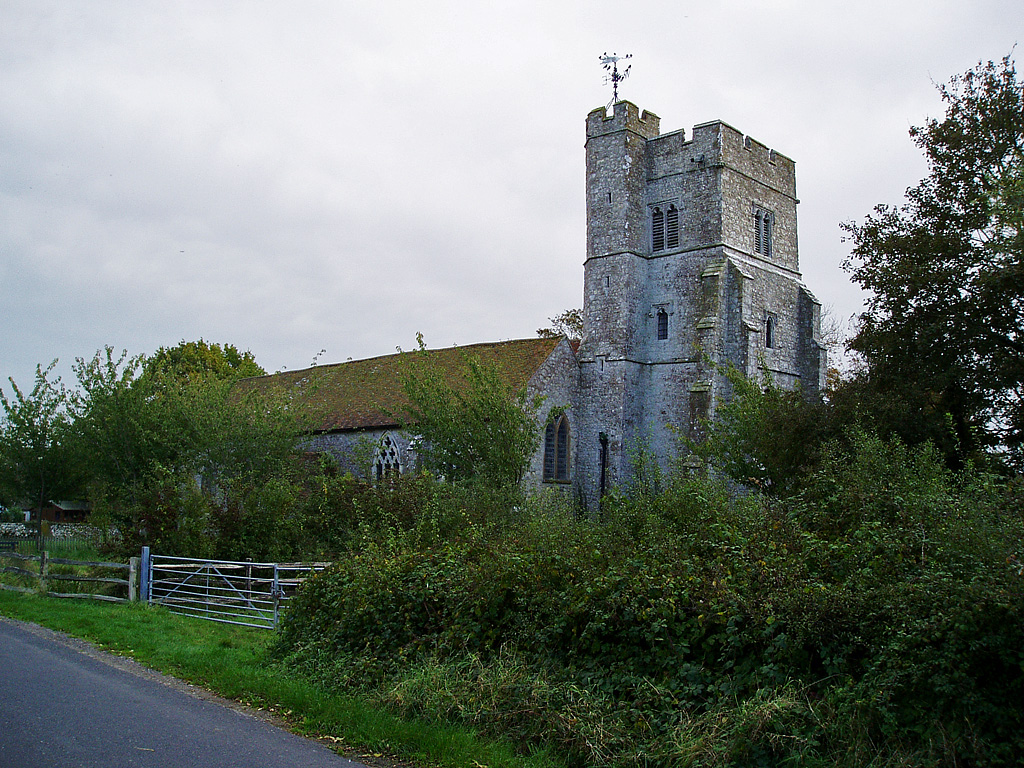
- Newchurch Church's leaning tower

- Location within Kent
- Population: 315 (2011)
- Civil parish: Newchurch
- District: Folkestone and Hythe
- Shire county: Kent
- Region: South East
- Country: England
- Sovereign state: United Kingdom
- Post town: Romney Marsh
- Postcode district: TN29
- Police: Kent
- Fire: Kent
- Ambulance: South East Coast
- UK Parliament: Folkestone and Hythe

Newchurch is a village and civil parish in the Folkestone and Hythe district in Kent, England. The village is located on the Romney Marsh, 3 miles (4.8 km) west of Dymchurch. In 2011 the parish had a population of 315.

During the Second World War it was home to an RAF airfield, RAF Newchurch, that operated Hawker Tempest fighter aircraft under Wing Commander Roland Beamont which participated in the defence of the UK against the German V-1 flying bomb offensive of 1944. A Chain Home coastal radar station was also located there.

The village's only pub, the Black Bull, owned at one time by Mackeson's Brewery and Shepherd Neame Brewery closed in 1995 and is now a private house.

The parish church is dedicated to St Peter and St Paul. The ecclesiastical parish forms part of the Romney Deanery of the Maidstone archdeaconry of the Diocese of Canterbury.
