= Walland Marsh =

Part of Romney Marsh in Kent and East Sussex

Coordinates: 50°58′00″N 0°50′00″E

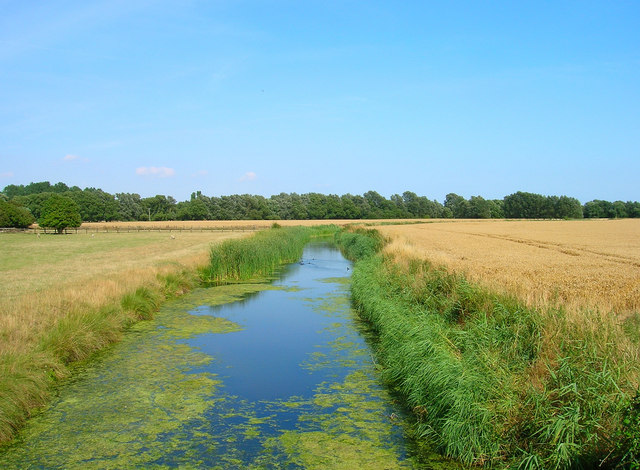
White Kemp Sewer, near Brookland

Walland Marsh is a part of Romney Marsh, mostly in Kent with part in East Sussex. The name means wall-land: its north-eastern border, separating it from the rest of Romney Marsh, is the Rhee Wall.

The Rhee Wall is 7.5 miles long and runs from Appledore, through Brenzett and Old Romney to New Romney; it consists of two parallel earth banks, from 50 to 100 metres apart, the ground between being raised above the marsh on either side. It was built in the 13th century, as a watercourse to wash away silt from the harbour at New Romney. The plan eventually failed; the Rhee Wall has not contained water since medieval times.

Walland Marsh is bordered in the south-east by Lydd (beyond which is Denge Marsh) and in the south-west by Rye. The villages of Fairfield, Brookland and East Guldeford are within the region.

The marsh was turned into productive farm land in past centuries. The land of Walland Marsh was reclaimed mostly from the 13th to 15th century, later than that of Romney Marsh to the north-east. The reclamation was done in stages by creating innings: an embankment was built round an area of marsh, which would drain at low tide.

To retain the productive land, drainage channels, known locally as sewers, were created. A notable example is White Kemp Sewer, which runs across the centre of the marsh, and flows into Jury's Gap Sewer; this leads to the coast at Jury's Gap, near Camber Sands.
