= Fairfield, Kent =

Village in Kent, England

Coordinates: 51.005°N 0.798°E

Fairfield
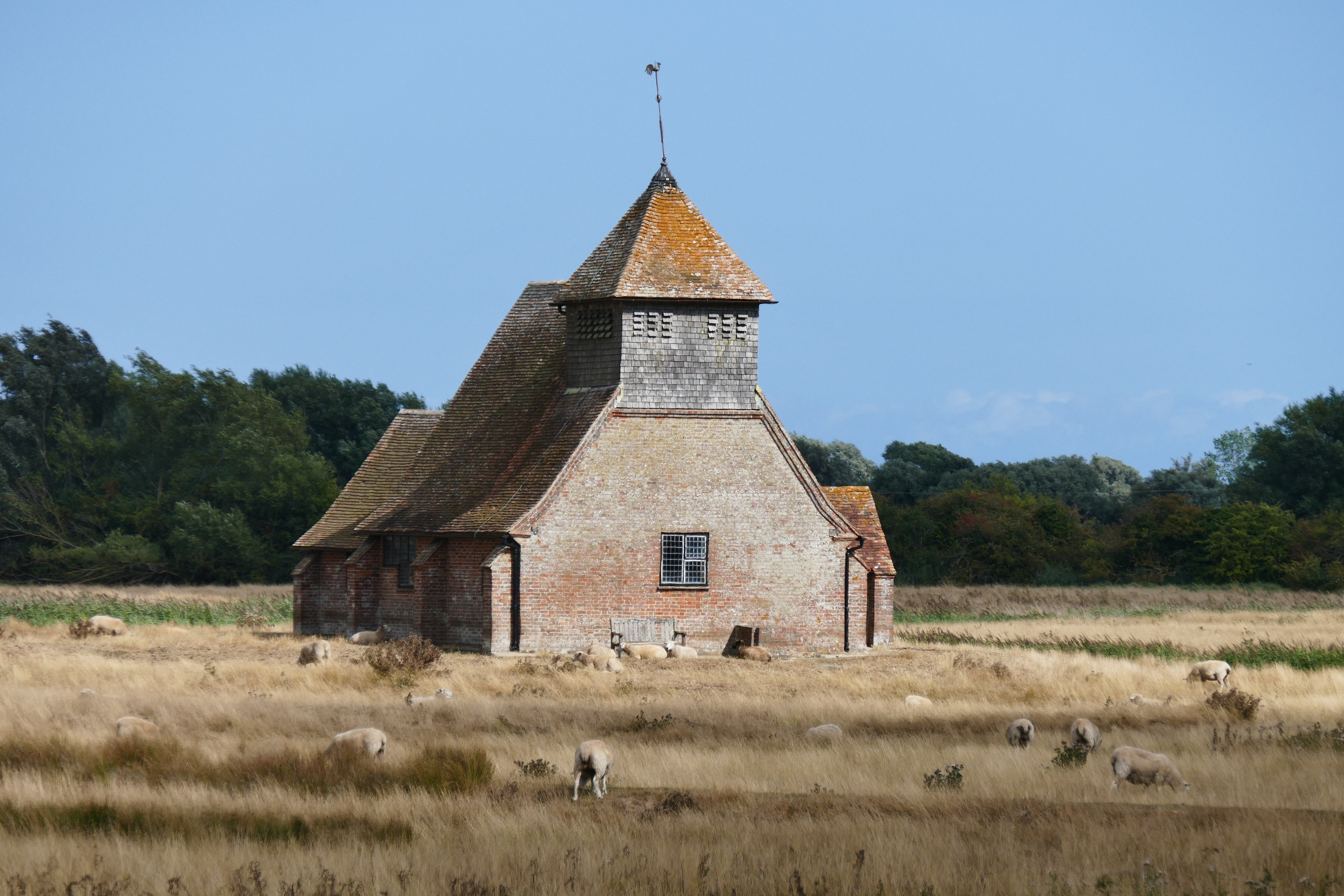
- St Thomas à Becket church

- Location within Kent
- Civil parish: Snargate
- District: Folkestone and Hythe
- Shire county: Kent
- Region: South East
- Country: England
- Sovereign state: United Kingdom
- Post town: Romney Marsh
- Postcode district: TN29
- Police: Kent
- Fire: Kent
- Ambulance: South East Coast
- UK Parliament: Folkestone and Hythe

Fairfield is a village and former civil parish, now in the parish of Snargate, in the Folkestone and Hythe district of Kent, England. In 1931 the parish had a population of 61. On 1 April 1934 the parish was abolished and merged with Snargate; part also went to Stone-cum-Ebony. The area lies west of the village of Brookland. It is in the Church of England parish of Brookland and Fairfield on Walland Marsh (part of Romney Marsh).

== Church of St Thomas à Becket ==
The isolated Church of St Thomas à Becket stands in open marshland and is accessible only by footpath, it is noted for its remote setting and has been a frequent subject for photographers, writers, and artists. The church was built in the 15th century on the site of an earlier church. Artist John Piper used the white panelling and black furnishings of Fairfield Church as inspiration for the prayer room at Nuffield College, Oxford. The church has also appeared in film adaptations of Charles Dickens’ Great Expectations. It is a Grade I listed building,
