= The Aldington Gang =

Criminal gang in Kent, England

Aldington was the stronghold of The Aldington Gang, a band of smugglers roaming the Romney Marshes and shores of Kent. The gang's leaders made the local inn, The Walnut Tree Inn, their headquarters and drop for their contraband. The Inn was often used when they waited for others of their group to bring in goods from across the Marshes. High up on the southern side of the inn is a small window through which the gang would shine a signal light to their partners up on Aldington Knoll when the way was clear for them.

They were probably the last 'major' gang that existed in Kent and it is believed that they were known as The Blues from the colour of the clothing that they wore or from blue flares used for signalling.

== The Gang's activities ==
The gang was probably founded in or around 1817, as gang-based smuggling returned, but the first mention of the Aldington Gang was in November 1820, after the men had returned home from the Napoleonic Wars and found little to do to make any money. It is believed that they were active well before this date and were responsible for incidents in Deal, St. Margaret's Bay, north of Dover. The gang carried out a landing near Sandgate with 250 men taking part, unloading a galley laden with spirits, tobacco and salt that had been rowed across the Channel from Boulogne and pulled up onto the shingle beach. Three groups of smugglers had gathered: one to unload and transport the cargo and two groups of "Batmen", to protect the first. They were spotted by a few local blockade men, as the main blockade force had been lured away by the smugglers. "Batmen" stood guard when a run was taking place to fight off anyone who tried to interfere; they gained their name from the long clubs, or ‘bats’ they carried. Some smugglers used guns, although the shooting of the Revenue officer often roused the authorities to step up their efforts against smuggling.

In February 1821 the Battle of Brookland took place between the Customs and Excise men and the Aldington Gang. The smugglers had sent 250 men down to the coast between Camber and Dungeness but the party was seen by the Watch House at Camber and a fight took place over Walland Marsh. Although the Gang successfully completed the unloading of the goods, they were harried right across the Marshes until they reached Brookland, where the Gang turned on the blockade force. Five men were killed in the fighting and there were more than twenty wounded. Their leader at that time was Cephas Quested who, in the confusion of the Battle, turned to a man close by him, handed him a musket and instructed him to "blow an Officer's brains out." Unfortunately for Quested, in the confusion of the fight and being somewhat intoxicated, the man that he had turned to was a Midshipman of the blockade force, who immediately turned the gun on Quested and arrested him. After being sentenced, Quested was taken to Newgate and hanged for his activities on 4 July 1821.

In 1782 George Ransley was born at Ruckinge, and started work as a ploughman then a carter. The story goes that he found a stash of spirits hidden by the smugglers and with the proceeds of the sale bought his house The Bourne Tap, from where he frequently sold spirits that he had landed. Another location frequented by the Gang at this time was an Augustine Priory, at Bilsington which was used as a farm house and they would use as a store house.

Ransley took over the gang of smugglers after the Battle of Brookland, and employed a doctor, with an allowance paid to a man's family if he was ill, a policy that avoided the capture of injured men by the revenue forces and helped to ensure loyalty. The gang became stronger and landed goods along the coast from Rye to Deal . In July 1826 they were caught on the beach at Dover and a Midshipman, Richard Morgan, was killed. In October 1826 Ransley was arrested at Aldington by the Bow Street Runners on suspicion of murder, but as it took place in the dark, the death sentence was converted to deportation along with his brother-in-law Samuel Bailey as was fellow gang members Thomas Gillham and James Hogben.

Ransley was sent to work on a farm in Tasmania where his knowledge of farming was a great benefit to him. Two years later his wife Elizabeth followed with their ten children - only nine survived the journey. He was assigned to his wife in 1833. He was finally granted a pardon in 1838 and farmed 500 acres (2.0 km^{2}) at River Plenty, Hobart. He died in 1856 and is buried in River Plenty, New Norfolk, along with his wife.

== Downfall ==
The success of smuggling gangs is dependent upon the goodwill of the local people. The gang began to lose this special relationship as they extended their ruthless behaviour beyond that of the publicly acceptable crime of smuggling and turned on the rural communities. Some of the members of the Gang started resorting to breaking into local residences.

The problems were compounded when Richard Morgan, a member of the blockade forces at Dover, was shot and killed. Morgan, who was a quartermaster with the blockade, was well liked in Dover and spotted the Gang trying to run a cargo ashore on Dover Beach. After firing a warning shot the Gang turned on him, resulting in his death and the wounding of a seaman who was with him. A reward was offered for information after this incident which was claimed by several people and as a consequence, in October, 1826 the blockade forces together with two Bow Street Runners raided The Bourne Tap and captured George Ransley and seven other members of the Gang. Eventually a total of nineteen men were captured and stood trial at Maidstone Assizes in January 1827. They were all found guilty of charges that carried the death penalty but their lawyer, a local gentleman from Maidstone, managed to get some of their sentences commuted to transportation.

== Stories ==
- There is a story that as a result of a fight between the Gang members one night, one of the smugglers' number was murdered and the body disposed of down a well at the side of the Inn. It is said that on some nights the sounds of scuffling and a body being dragged outside can still be heard.
- Although the Gang had a brutal reputation, they were not without a sense of humour. One officer who was blindfolded and had his legs bound was told he was to be thrown over a cliff. He managed to cling on to tufts of grass as he fell and hung with his legs dangling for some time. It was not until his blindfold slipped that he realised his feet were a matter of inches above the ground. The 'cliff' was only seven feet (2.1 m) high.
- Ransley lived at a The Bourne Tap and stories were circulated about there being a ghost which manifested itself as a floating severed head in the old building which served well to keep the curious away.
- Ransley was known for his organisational abilities but stories differ about the man. Some said he was a giant of over six feet, others said he was hardly more than five feet tall, some said he was a likeable rogue, others lived in absolute fear of him. Whatever was the truth, there was no doubt that he could be as ruthless as the situation demanded.
