= Owling =

Smuggling of sheep or wool from England

Owling was a common term for the smuggling of sheep or wool from England to another country, particularly France. The practice was illegal in England from 1367 until 1824. Participants were called "owlers"; their ships "owling boats".

The origins of the term are obscure, and it appears to have developed toward the end of the 17th century, well after owling was first outlawed. It is presumed to derive from owlers' preference for performing their work at night (traditionally the time of the owl). The earliest citation in the Oxford English Dictionary is Narcissus Luttrell's report in 1699 that a recent outbreak had been suppressed. The practice seems not to have had a particular name attached to it before that point.

The principal reason for the protectionist law was to shield English clothing manufacturers from foreign competition, since England had a large supply of wool but a less successful textile industry. The wool industry was England's most lucrative in the late 12th and early 13th centuries; in fact, in discussing the origins of the wool protection laws, David Hume claims that wool was England's only valuable export commodity at the time. However, the law was enacted by Edward III in the first place, and maintained throughout its history, as part of a particular grudge against France, as Hume points out. The original statute was strengthened several times; in 1566 owling was made punishable by "cutting off of the left hand and nailing it in a public place", and in 1660, as it became more professionalized, by the seizure of the ship used.

The law gained particular currency after a 1689 bill outlawing all trade with France. Owlers were able to take advantage of a significant black market, and smuggling increased rapidly during the 1690s. According to G. N. Clark, period sources indicate that by 1689, 480,000 pounds of wool per year were being smuggled to France. Troops were sent to Romney Marsh, the chief point of departure for owlers, in 1693; conflict in the area over the practice (including both owlers and local wool manufacturers opposed to owling) came to a head with a riot in Rye, East Sussex in 1696. The government began to get the upper hand soon afterward, and owling was apparently no longer common when the law was repealed in the 19th century.
