= Rhee Wall =

Former watercourse in Kent

Coordinates: 51°0.1841′N 0°51.9534′E

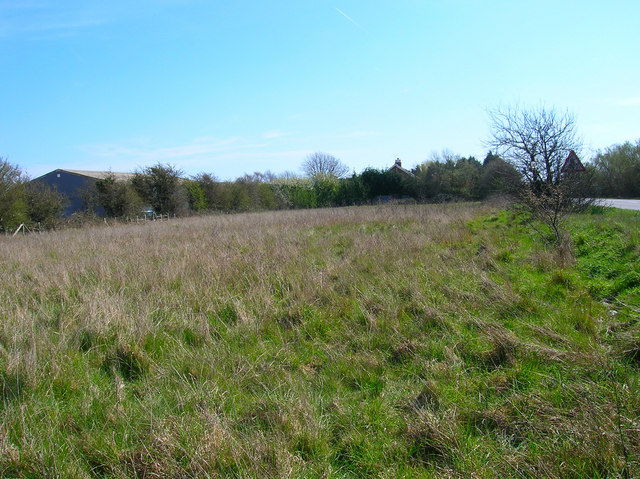
Looking south-east along the Rhee Wall, about half a mile south-east of Brenzett. The right-hand side is occupied by the main road, the A259; the width of the Rhee Wall extends as far as the barn on the left.

The Rhee Wall is a former watercourse in Romney Marsh in Kent, England. It is 7.5 miles (12.1 km) long and runs from Appledore, on the north-western edge of Romney Marsh, south-east through Snargate, Brenzett and Old Romney, to New Romney near the coast. The Rhee Wall forms a boundary between Romney Marsh proper, to the north-east, and Walland Marsh to the south-west.

It consists of two parallel earth banks, from 50 to 100 metres apart, the ground between being raised above the marsh on either side.

It was built in the 13th century: a watercourse was constructed from Appledore to Old Romney, which was extended in 1258 to New Romney. The purpose was to wash away silt from the harbour at New Romney; there were sluices to control the flow at Appledore, Snargate and New Romney. However, the silt at New Romney continued to accumulate. After the South England flood of February 1287, the harbour at New Romney was completely blocked. The River Rother, which had flowed into the sea here, was diverted away. The Rhee Wall has not contained water since medieval times.

The Rhee Wall has since been used as a dry causeway above the marsh. In the present day, the B2080 road follows the route of the Rhee Wall from Appledore south-east to Brenzett; the route continues south-east to New Romney as part of the A259 road.
