= Bilsington Priory =

Former Augustinian priory in Kent, England

Coordinates: 51°4′58″N 0°54′56″E

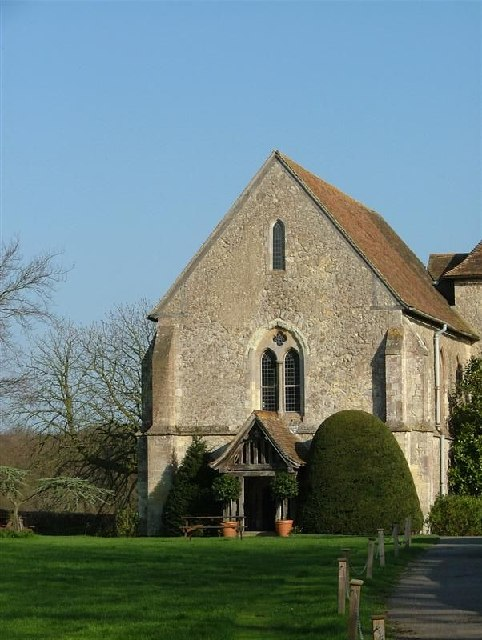
The north wing of St Mary's Priory, seen from the west

Bilsington Priory (Bilsvitone, Bilswithetun, Beilsington) is a former Augustinian priory in Kent, England, about 3/4 mile (1 km) north of Bilsington and about 5 miles (8 km) south of Ashford. Mentioned in the Domesday book as held by Odo of Bayeaux, Earl of Kent and Bishop of Bayeaxu, it was founded in 1253 by John Maunsell, with help from the canons of Merton Priory, which provided the first three priors. Being a monastic house under £200, it was suppressed in the 1536 Dissolution of the Monasteries. Its lands were granted to Anthony St Leger, who exchanged them with Thomas Cranmer, Archbishop of Canterbury. Bilsington Priory is mentioned as providing a hospital and preaching to the local community.

Some of its buildings survived and were converted into a farmhouse. In 1906 they were restored to designs by JT Micklethwaite. They are Grade I listed. The priory is now a wedding and conference venue overlooking Romney Marsh.

Bilsington Priory is a Grade 1 English Heritage listing no 181660. The Priory is divided into two stories by massive transverse beams, measuring 15.1 inches by 13 inches. The walls are graffiti from the Durham Light Infantry who were stationed in South-East England in 1940 in the aftermath of Dunkirk.
