= Hope Church of All Saints =

Ruined church in Kent, England

All Saints Church, Hope
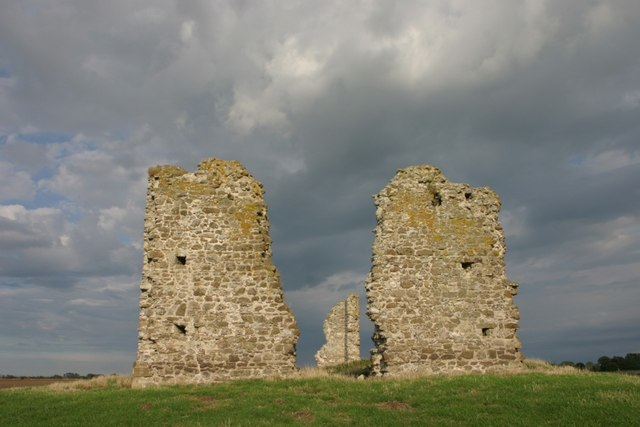
- Viewed from the west, in 2006

- Location within Kent
- 50°59′42.360″N 0°55′8.663″E
- Location: New Romney, Kent
- OS grid reference: TR 049 258

History
- Built: 12th century

Scheduled monument
- Designated: 13 July 1978
- Reference no.: 1003605

Listed Building – Grade II
- Designated: 9 June 1959
- Reference no.: 1231591

The Hope Church of All Saints is a ruined church building on Romney Marsh, about 1 mile (1.6 km) north-west of New Romney, in Kent, England, near the road from Ivychurch to New Romney. Since 2017 a sculpture park has been created on the site.

== History ==
It is thought that the church, in the former parish of Hope, was founded in the 12th century. It was still in use in 1543, but had fallen into decay by 1573; the bells were removed to the Church of St Nicholas at New Romney. Hope Church was recorded as ruinous in 1663.

There have been surface finds of medieval objects near the site, including coins from the 11th to the 13th century. These, and traces of a possible sunken road near the church, suggest that there was a deserted medieval village nearby.

== Description ==
The site is a scheduled monument; the standing remains are Grade II listed.

The church, rectangular in plan, is built of roughly coursed stone interspersed with flint. At the west end, walls survive as L-shaped blocks at the corners, to a height of about 4.5 metres (15 ft), with a gap between them. There is a similar block at the south-east corner of the chancel. The surviving walls are linked by foundations. A rectangular ditch, enclosing an area about 63 by 53 metres (207 by 174 ft), surrounds the church, with a break in the east and west sides.

== Sculpture park ==
The IMOS Foundation, an arts charity founded by Briony Kapoor, undertook the care of the site in February 2017. Four bridges were erected across the surrounding ditch to improve access to the church, and more than 200 trees have been planted. A sculpture park has been created: the sculptures include those of saints of all kinds, since "... the idea evolved... to use... the widest possible meaning of the word ALL in All Saints."
