= Denge Marsh =

Marsh in Kent, England

Coordinates: 50°56′15″N 0°55′15″E

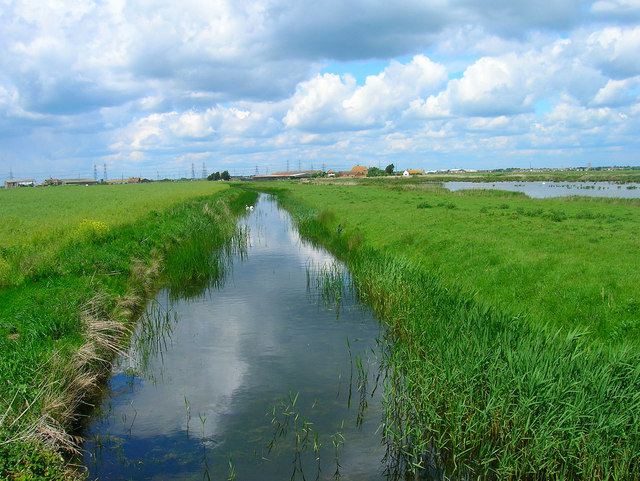
Denge Marsh Sewer

Denge Marsh /ˈdɛndʒ/, also spelled Dengemarsh and occasionally called the Denge, is a part of Romney Marsh in Kent. Its north-west boundary is the town of Lydd; to the south-east is Denge Beach and Dungeness.

== History ==
In Roman times, the area which is now Romney Marsh was under water. Lympne and Appledore, which are now on the northern edge of Romney Marsh, were coastal ports. There were islands in the area, including Lydd. Denge Marsh, south-east of Lydd, was one of the earliest parts in the area to be reclaimed from the water by drainage; this is recorded in a charter of A.D. 744. Reclamation of the adjacent area, the present-day Walland Marsh which is to the north-west of Lydd, continued through the Middle Ages. Drainage dykes, known locally as sewers, were built.

== Sound mirrors ==
At the north-eastern edge of Denge Marsh, near Greatstone-on-Sea, stand the sound mirrors, also known as acoustic mirrors at RAF Denge: they are large concrete structures, built as an experiment between 1928 and 1930. Sound could be focussed onto microphones, so giving an early warning of the approach of enemy aircraft. The invention of radar made them obsolete.
