= St Dunstan's Church, Snargate =

Church of St Dunstan, Snargate
- Church of St Dunstan, Snargate
- 51°01′21.72″N 0°50′13.69″E
- OS grid reference: TQ 99069 28646
- Location: Snargate
- Country: England
- Denomination: Church of England
- Website: www.romneychurches.org/romney-marsh-churches/snargate

History
- Dedication: Saint Dunstan

Architecture
- Heritage designation: Grade II*
- Designated: 9 June 1959

Administration
- Diocese: Diocese of Canterbury
- Deanery: Romney Deanery

St Dunstan's Church is a Anglican church in the village of Snargate, Kent. It is the in the Romney Marsh Benefice, in the Romney Deanery, and in the Diocese of Canterbury. The earliest parts of the church date from about 1200, and it was modified later in the medieval period. It was restored in 1870–72. Ir is Grade II* listed

== Description ==
Interior, looking east

The nave is the oldest part of the church, dating from about 1200. North and south aisles were added during the 13th century, each with an arcade of four bays; the north aisle, of which the arcade differs from the south arcade, is thought to be slightly later. There are medieval patterned floor tiles at the east end of the north aisle. The chancel was built in the 14th century, extending the church eastwards; there is a three-light traceried east window, below which is the inscription "This Chancel was restored by Edward Wilkinson Rector A.D.1870". There is no chancel arch.

The tower, at the west end, was built in the early 15th century, and there is a three-light traceried window of the same age in the west wall of the tower. The south porch dates from the late 18th century.

The roof of the nave, dating from the 16th century, has five crown posts and tie beams. The chancel roof is mostly 19th-century and has two crown posts on medieval tie-beams. The roof of the north aisle is 14th-century; it has common rafters with collar beams and tie-beams. Five of the seven tie-beams have central bosses carrved with emblems of landowners of the time.

=== Wall painting of ship ===
The great ship

On the wall of the north aisle is a painting, in red ochre, dating from about 1500, of a ship; the details, showing four masts, a forecastle, half deck and quarter deck, indicate that it is a "great ship", a type of vessel made from about 1480 to 1520, weight about 800 tons. It is thought that the painting, situated opposite the main door, may have been a sign to smugglers that it was a safe place to hide goods.

=== Bells ===
There are three bells, in an oak frame. The tenor bell, by William le Belyetere of Canterbury, dates from 1325; a bell at St. Dunstan's, Canterbury, has the same maker and date. Another bell, dated 1673, is by John & Christopher Hodson of Whitechapel. The maker and date of the third bell are unknown.

=== Rectors ===
Richard Barham, the author of The Ingoldsby Legends, was the rector of the church from 1817 to 1829. In the late 19th century, the father of the painter Harold Gilman was the rector.
