= Listed buildings in Bilsington =

Civil Parish in Kent, England

Bilsington is a village and civil parish in the Borough of Ashford of Kent, England. It contains one grade I, two grade II* and 21 grade II listed buildings that are recorded in the National Heritage List for England.

This list is based on the information retrieved online from Historic England.

== Key ==
Grade	Criteria
I	Buildings that are of exceptional interest
II*	Particularly important buildings of more than special interest
II	Buildings that are of special interest

== Listing ==
Name	Grade	Location	Type	Completed (Note: The date given is the date used by Historic England as significant for the initial building or that of an important part in the structure's description.)	Date designated	Grid ref. (Note: The grid reference is based on the British national grid reference system, sometimes known as OSGB36, used by the Ordnance Survey.) Geo-coordinates	Notes	Entry number (Note: The "List Entry Number" is a unique number assigned to each listed building and scheduled monument by Historic England.)	Image	Wikidata
Barn About 20 Metres South of Fagg's Farmhouse	II	Ashford Road			10 August 1988	TR0327735633; 51°05′02″N 0°54′04″E		1362783	Upload Photo	Q26644652
Weavers Cottage	II	Ashford Road			10 August 1988	TR0328435678; 51°05′04″N 0°54′04″E		1071227	Upload Photo	Q26326249
The Farmhouse	II	Ashford Road			10 August 1988	TR0326135655; 51°05′03″N 0°54′03″E		1184617	Upload Photo	Q26479947
Prospect Place	II	Ashford Road			10 August 1988	TR0380634852; 51°04′36″N 0°54′29″E		1184629	Upload Photo	Q26479959
Bourne Farmhouse	II	Bourne Road			8 April 1988	TR0441736572; 51°05′31″N 0°55′04″E		1071228	Upload Photo	Q26326251
The Bourne Tap	II	Bourne Road			10 August 1988	TR0462936398; 51°05′25″N 0°55′14″E		1071186	Upload Photo	Q26326171
Barn About 50 Metres South West of Court Lodge	II*	Newchurch Road			10 August 1988	TR0411534234; 51°04′16″N 0°54′44″E		1300006	Upload Photo	Q17556862
Bell and Housing 1 Metres South West of Church of St Peter and St Paul	II	Newchurch Road			10 August 1988	TR0420734259; 51°04′17″N 0°54′48″E		1071192	Upload Photo	Q26326182
Church of St Peter and St Paul	II*	Newchurch Road			27 November 1957	TR0421634264; 51°04′17″N 0°54′49″E		1071191	Church of St Peter and St Paul More images	Q17556155
Court Lodge	II	Newchurch Road			27 November 1957	TR0415234270; 51°04′17″N 0°54′46″E		1362806	Upload Photo	Q26644672
Granary About 10 Metres South East of Pear Tree Farmhouse	II	Newchurch Road			10 August 1988	TR0429632948; 51°03′34″N 0°54′50″E		1299954	Upload Photo	Q26587300
Pear Tree Farmhouse	II	Newchurch Road			10 August 1988	TR0426432956; 51°03′35″N 0°54′49″E		1071193	Upload Photo	Q26326183
Sundial About 10 Metres South of Church of St Peter and St Paul	II	Newchurch Road			10 August 1988	TR0421734251; 51°04′16″N 0°54′49″E		1184735	Upload Photo	Q26480059
The Cosway Monument	II	Newchurch Road			27 November 1957	TR0392734285; 51°04′18″N 0°54′34″E		1184823	The Cosway Monument More images	Q26480138
Willow Trees and Wall Attached	II	Newchurch Road			10 August 1988	TR0406434370; 51°04′21″N 0°54′41″E		1362768	Upload Photo	Q26644637
St Augustines Priory (medieval Buildings)	I	Priory Road			13 October 1952	TR0434135525; 51°04′58″N 0°54′58″E		1362769	Upload Photo	Q17529451
Rowling Street Farm	II	Rowling Street			10 August 1988	TR0213136773; 51°05′41″N 0°53′07″E		1184867	Upload Photo	Q26480178
Cross House	II	The Cross			10 August 1988	TR0396834470; 51°04′24″N 0°54′37″E		1362805	Upload Photo	Q26644671
Forge Cottage	II	The Cross			10 August 1988	TR0397034493; 51°04′25″N 0°54′37″E		1071189	Upload Photo	Q26326178
Knights Cottage	II	The Cross			10 August 1988	TR0397934498; 51°04′25″N 0°54′37″E		1071188	Upload Photo	Q26326175
St Amand and Number 4 Cross Cottages	II	The Cross			10 August 1988	TR0401734510; 51°04′25″N 0°54′39″E		1362803	Upload Photo	Q26644669
The Cottage	II	The Cross			27 November 1957	TR0398334503; 51°04′25″N 0°54′37″E		1071187	Upload Photo	Q26326173
The Old House	II	The Cross			27 November 1957	TR0397834511; 51°04′25″N 0°54′37″E		1362804	Upload Photo	Q26644670
The White Horse	II	The Cross			10 August 1988	TR0399234473; 51°04′24″N 0°54′38″E		1071190	The White Horse More images	Q26326179

== See also ==
- Grade I listed buildings in Kent
- Grade II* listed buildings in Kent

== Sources ==
- Newman, John (2012) [1969], Kent: West and the Weald, The Buildings of England, New Haven and London: Yale University Press, ISBN 978-0-300-18509-6
