= East Guldeford =

Village in East Sussex, England

Coordinates: 50.9586°N 0.755°E

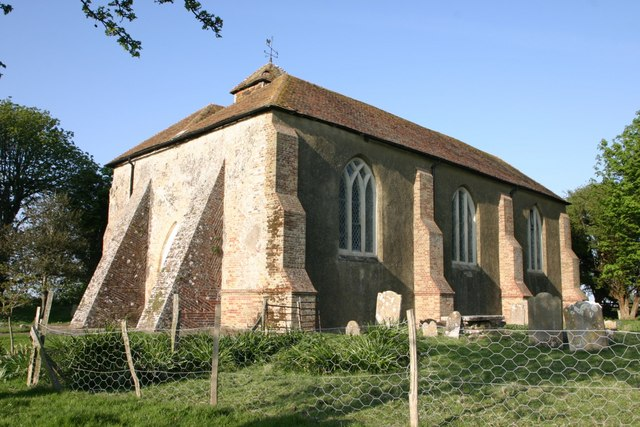
- St Mary's Church

- Location within East Sussex
- Area: 16.6 km^{2} (6.4 sq mi) -inc Playden
- Population: 327 (Parish-2007) includes Playden
  - Density: 51/sq mi (20/km^{2})
- OS grid reference: TQ925226
  - London: 53 miles (85 km) NW
- District: Rother
- Shire county: East Sussex
- Region: South East
- Country: England
- Sovereign state: United Kingdom
- Post town: RYE
- Postcode district: TN31
- Dialling code: 01797
- Police: Sussex
- Fire: East Sussex
- Ambulance: South East Coast
- UK Parliament: Hastings and Rye

East Guldeford is a village and civil parish in the Rother district of East Sussex, England. The village is located one mile (1.6 km) east of Rye on the A259 road. The parish is controlled by a parish meeting. It is in the civil parish of Playden. The parish church is dedicated to St Mary. It was consecrated in 1505.
