= Bilsington =

Village in Kent, England

Coordinates: 51.0720°N 0.9114°E

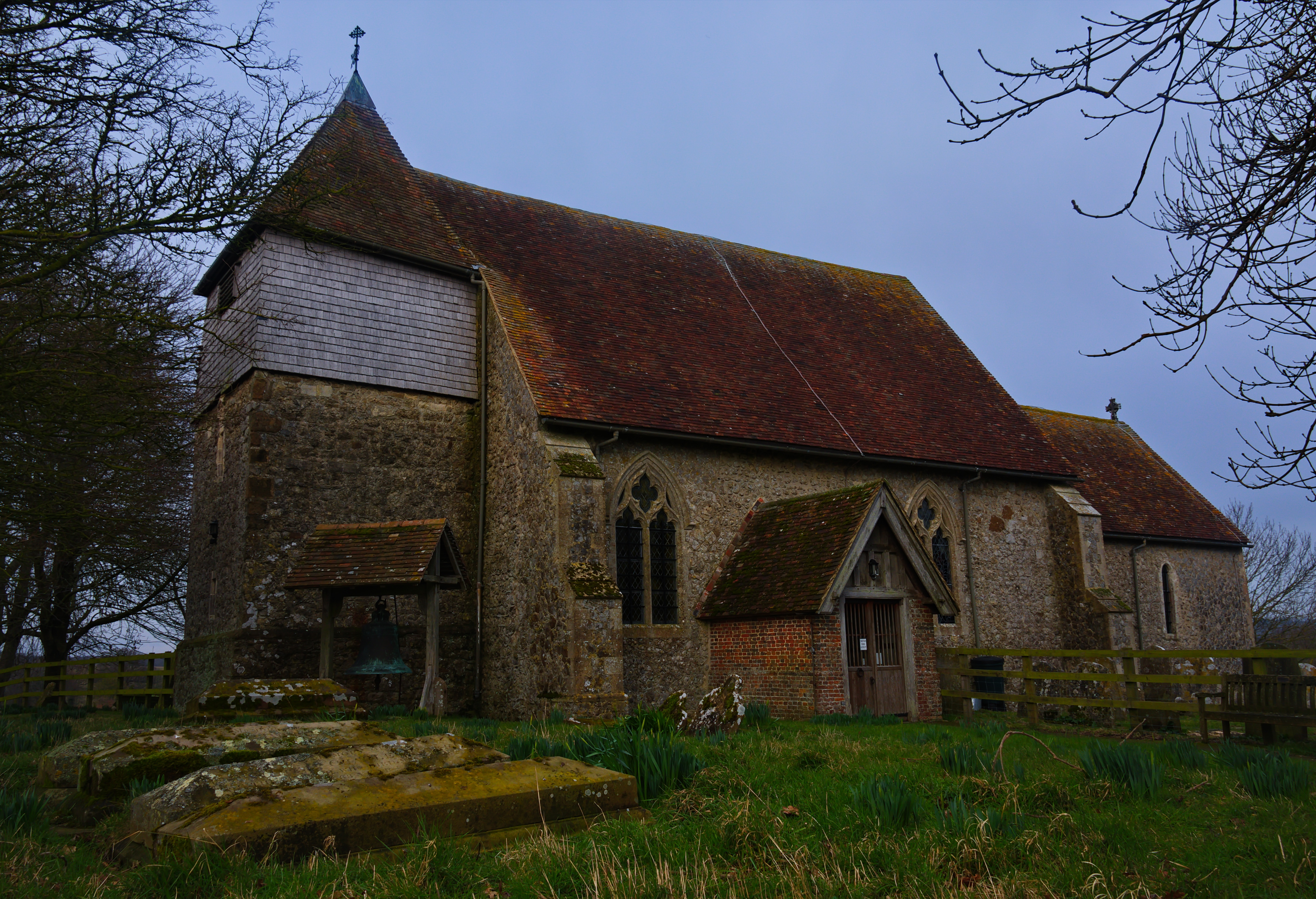
- Parish church of St Peter & St Paul

- Location within Kent
- Area: 11.12 km^{2} (4.29 sq mi)
- Population: 302 (2021 census)
  - Density: 27/km^{2} (70/sq mi)
- OS grid reference: TR0434
- Civil parish: Bilsington
- District: Ashford
- Shire county: Kent
- Region: South East
- Country: England
- Sovereign state: United Kingdom
- Post town: ASHFORD
- Postcode district: TN25
- Dialling code: 01233
- Police: Kent
- Fire: Kent
- Ambulance: South East Coast
- UK Parliament: Weald of Kent
- Website: Bilsington Parish Council

Bilsington is a village and civil parish in the Ashford district of Kent, England. The village is about 5 miles (8 km) south of Ashford, on the B2067 road, Hamstreet to Hythe road north of the Royal Military Canal.

About of a quarter of the parish is wooded, along most of the northern slopes leading up to the escarpment of the High Weald. The 2011 census recorded the parish's population as 284.

== History ==
=== Parish church ===
The Church of England parish church of Saints Peter and Paul was built in the 12th century. Above the west door to the tower is some 12th-century stonework. One blocked Norman window survives over the south door.

The other windows were replaced in the 14th century and include some fragments of original Medieval glass. The west tower was added in the 16th century. Above the chancel arch hangs the Royal arms of George III, dated 1774. The church was restored in 1883 to designs by Joseph Clarke. It is a Grade II* listed building.

=== Priory ===
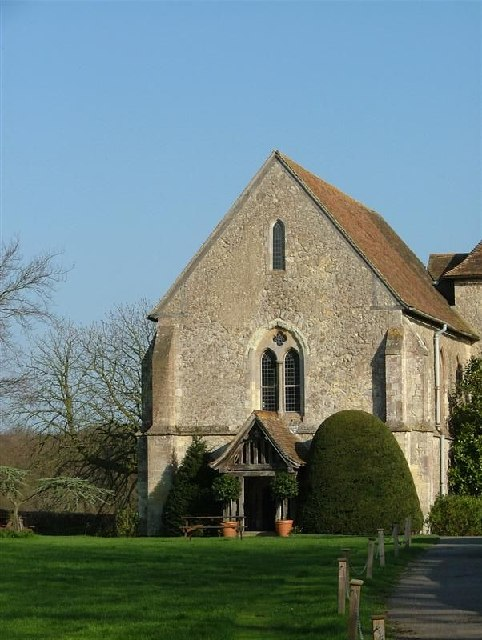
The north wing of St Mary's Priory

The Augustinian Priory of St Mary was founded in 1253 and suppressed in the dissolution of the monasteries in 1536. Its surviving buildings are about 3/4 mile (1 km) north of the village.

The Aldington Gang is said to have used the Priory in some of its smuggling exploits of the 1820s. In 1906 the surviving buildings were restored to designs by JT Micklethwaite. They are Grade I listed. The Priory is now a wedding and conference venue.

=== Royal Military Canal ===
The Royal Military Canal passes through the parish just south of the village. It was begun in 1804 and completed in 1809.

=== Cosway monument ===
Just west of the village is an obelisk 58 feet (18 m) high. It is a monument erected in 1835 to the memory of Member of Parliament and local landowner Sir William Cosway, who was killed in a coaching accident in 1834.

== Amenities ==
Bilsington has a pub, the White Horse, and a Cricket Club.

== See also ==
- Listed buildings in Bilsington
