= Romney Marsh =

Wetland in south-east England

- Wetlands
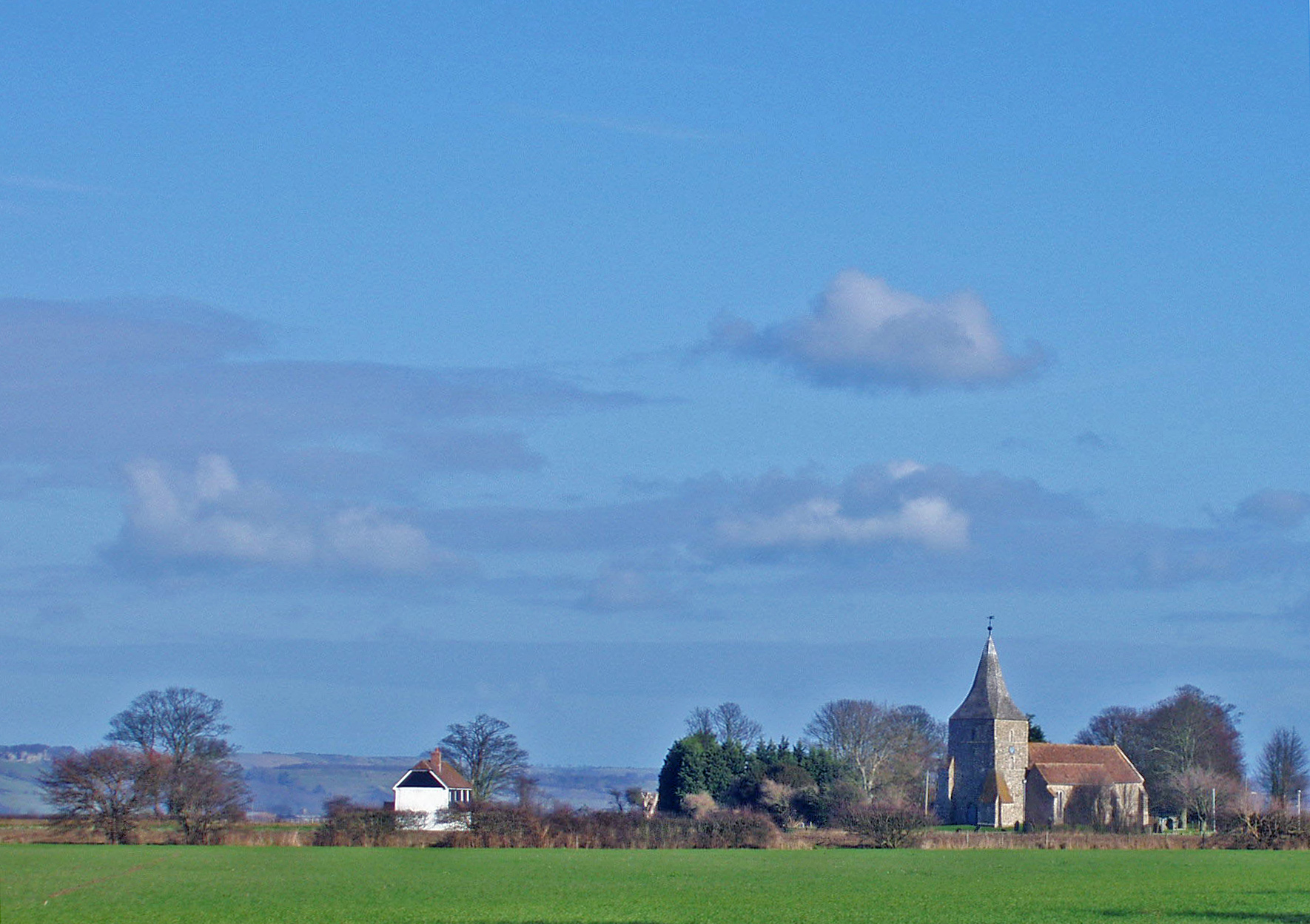
- St Mary in the Marsh in Romney Marsh

- Location within Kent
- Coordinates: 50.96°N 0.92°E
- Grid position: TR053224
- Location: Kent, England, UK

Romney Marsh is a sparsely populated wetland area in the counties of Kent and East Sussex in the south-east of England. It covers about 100 square miles (260 km^{2}). The Marsh has been in use for centuries, though its inhabitants commonly suffered from malaria until the 18th century. Due to its location, geography and isolation, it was important for smugglers between the 17th and 19th centuries. The area has long been used for sheep pasture: Romney Marsh sheep are considered one of the most successful and important sheep breeds. Featuring numerous waterways, and with some areas lying below sea level, the Marsh has over time sustained a gradual level of reclamation, both through natural causes and by human intervention. The name Romney likely comes from the Old English Rumen ea meaning the "large watery place".

== Governance ==
An electoral ward in the same name exists. This ward had a population of 2,358 at the 2011 census.

== Quotations ==
- "As Egypt was the gift of the Nile, this level tract ... has by the bounty of the sea been by degrees added to the land, so that I may not without reason call it the Gift of the Sea." (from Britannia by William Camden 1551–1623)
- "The world according to the best geographers is divided into Europe, Asia, Africa, America, and Romney Marsh" from Ingoldsby Legends, Reverend Richard Harris Barham (Rector of Snargate)

== Areas of Romney Marsh ==
Romney Marsh is flat and low-lying, with parts below sea level. It consists of several areas:

- the Romney Marsh proper, lying north of a line between New Romney and Appledore;
- the Walland Marsh, south of that line to approximately the Kent/East Sussex border;
- the East Guldeford Level, south again to Rye;
- the Denge Marsh, south-east of Lydd, which now includes Denge Beach and Dungeness;
- the Rother Levels, which, with various ditches, lie around the Isle of Oxney; and
- the Rye, Winchelsea and Pett Levels.

=== River Rother ===
View across the marsh from Rye

The River Rother today flows into the sea below Rye, but until 1287 its mouth lay between Romney and Lydd. It was tidal far upstream, almost to Bodiam. The river mouth was wide with a huge lagoon, making Rye a port at its western end. That lagoon lay behind a large island, which now makes up a large part of the Denge Marsh, on which stood the ports of Lydd and the old Winchelsea. All these ports were affiliated to (as "limbs" of) the Cinque Ports.

=== Reclamation ===
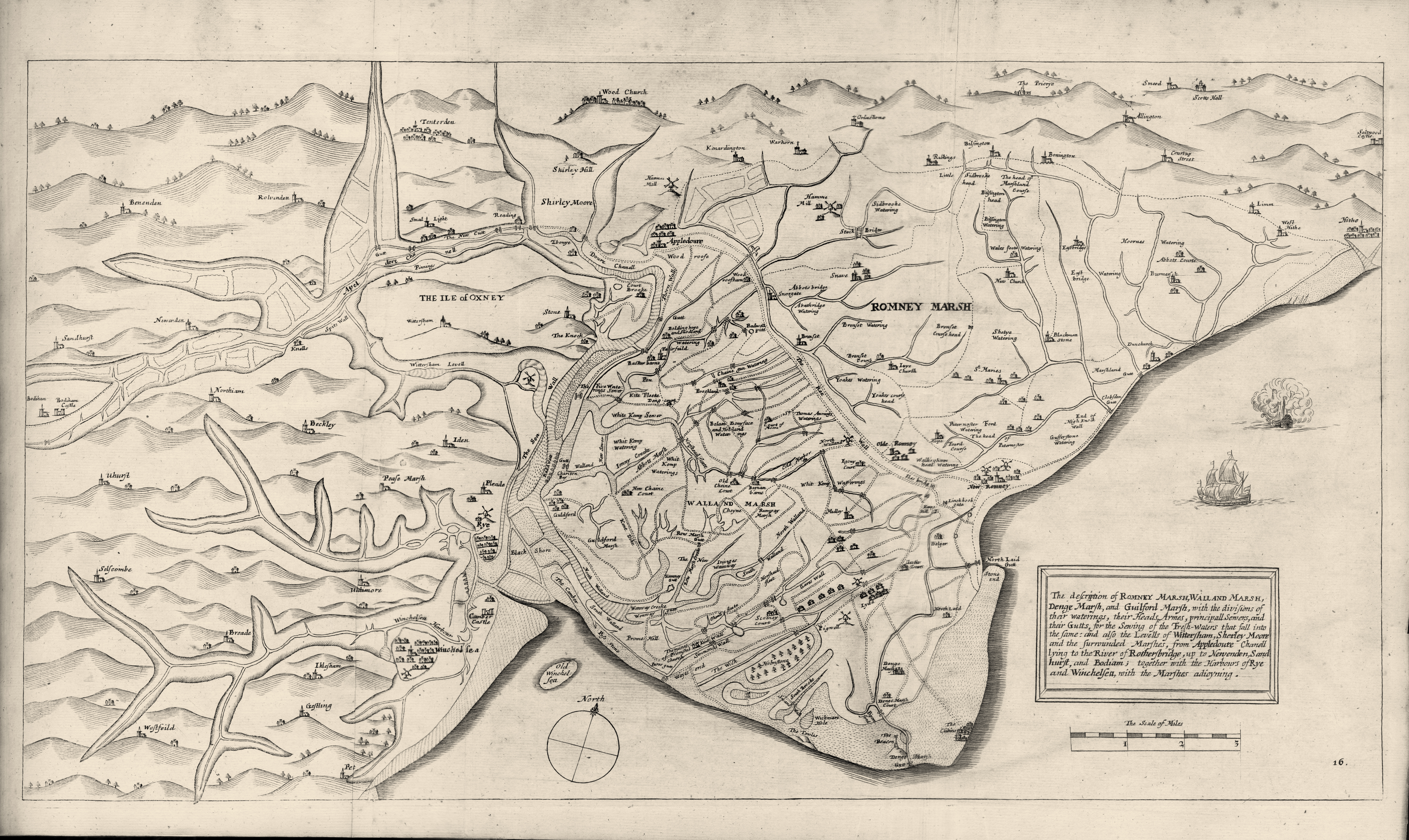
A map of Romney Marsh, from The History of Imbanking and Drayning by William Dugdale (1662)

The Romney Marsh has been gradually built up over the centuries.

==== Rhee Wall ====
The most significant feature of the Marsh is the Rhee Wall (Rhee is a word for river), forming a prominent ridge. This feature was extended as a waterway in three stages from Appledore to New Romney in the 13th century. Sluices controlled the flow of water, which was then released to flush silt from the harbour at New Romney. Ultimately, the battle was lost: the harbour silted up and New Romney declined in importance. The Rhee kept part of the old port open until the 15th century.

The wall at Dymchurch was built around the same time: storms had breached the shingle barrier, which had protected it until that time. It is a common misconception that both these structures were built by the Romans.

==== Shingle ====
In 1250 and in the following years, a series of violent storms broke through the coastal shingle banks, flooding significant areas and returning it to marsh, and destroying the harbour at New Romney. In 1287, water destroyed the port town of Old Winchelsea (now located some 2 mi (3 km) out in Rye bay), which had been endangered because of its proximity to the sea since at least 1236. Winchelsea, the third-largest port in England and a major importer of wine, was relocated on higher land, with a harbour consisting of 82 wharfs. Those same storms, however, helped to build up more shingle; such beaches now ran along practically the whole seaward side of the marshland.

By the 14th century, much of the Walland and Denge Marshes had been reclaimed by "innings", the process of throwing up an embankment around the sea-marsh and using the low-tide to let it run dry by means of one-way drains set into the new seawall, running off into a network of dykes called locally "sewers". In 1462, the Romney Marsh Corporation was established to install drainage and sea defences for the marsh, which it continued to build into the 16th century. By that time, the course of the Rother had been changed to its channel today; most of the remainder of the area had now been reclaimed from the sea.

Today, shingle continues to be deposited in the harbour. As a result, all the original Cinque Ports of the Marsh are now far from the sea. Dungeness Point is still being added to (especially near Dungeness and Hythe), though a daily operation is in place to counter the reshaping of the shingle banks, using boats to dredge and move the drifting shingle.

==== Habitation ====
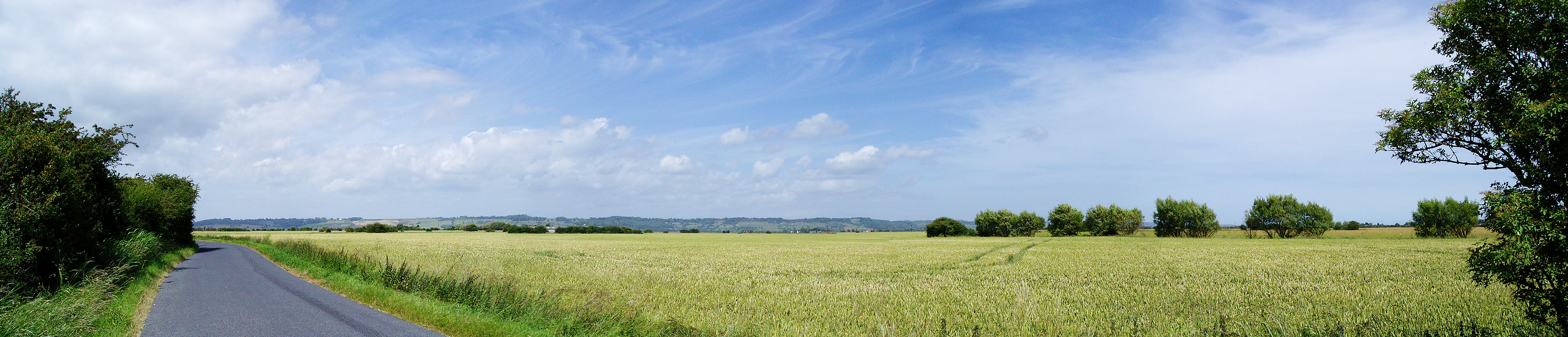
View across the marsh from just outside Dymchurch

Much of the Marsh became the property of the Priory of Canterbury in the 9th century, when the lands owned by the double minster of Lyminge were transferred to Christ Church, Canterbury. Prior Wilbert granted a tenancy on their land in Misleham, now part of Brookland parish, to a man called Baldwin, sometime between 1155 and 1167, for "all their land in Misleham which lies in the Marsh, in so far as Baldwin can inclose it against the sea"; Baldwin's Sewer (drainage ditch) remains in use. The marsh has since become covered by a dense network of drainage ditches that once supported large farming communities. These watercourses have been maintained and managed by internal drainage boards (IDBs) for sustainable water levels since the 1930s. In April 2001, the five drainage boards responsible for the marsh amalgamated to form the Romney Marshes Area IDB.

==== Sustainability ====
Romney Marsh is adjacent to the High Weald Area of Outstanding Natural Beauty, which is less developed than many other areas in Kent and Sussex. The decline in sheep prices meant that even the local stock (sold around the world for breeding for over two centuries) became unsustainable. Turfing had always been a lesser practice due to the grassland kept short by the sheep reared upon it, but farms are increasing in size to compensate for the decline in sustainable livestock farming. Some view this as unsustainable due to the damage to soil ecology of the Marsh. The only other alternative, since 1946, has been for farmers to turn to arable farming, changing the landscape from a patchwork of small family farms to a few extensive arable production units.

== Wind farm ==
A 59.8 MW wind farm was constructed by Npower Renewables at Little Cheyne Court, 7 kilometres (4.3 miles) west of Lydd and commissioned in March 2009. There were objections to the planned development from Kent County Council, Shepway District Council, English Nature and the Royal Society for the Protection of Birds (RSPB), and so a public enquiry was held to consider the application and objections. English Nature and the RSPB were concerned about possible detrimental effects of the wind farm on bird populations, as the location is close to a designated Site of Special Scientific Interest (SSSI) and a European Union Special Protection Area (SPA), because it provides habitat for large numbers of migratory birds. Bewick swans and shovellers spend the winter there, while there are large breeding populations of common terns, little terns and Mediterranean gulls. The enquiry concluded that the project would not adversely affect the conservation areas, and the two organisations entered into a formal agreement with Npower Renewables to monitor and manage the area, with Npower funding the programme.

== Romney Marsh sheep ==
Sheep have formed an important part of the economy of Romney Marsh for over 700 years. Romney Marsh sheep were bred from European white face, long-tailed sheep, but by 1800 they were considered to be a distinct breed. Some cross-breeding with Leicester sheep took place at around that time, to improve their characteristics. They are dual-purpose animals, producing good meat and quality wool. They are particularly adapted to wet conditions, being resistant to foot rot, while their fleeces stay healthy in the harsh conditions found on the Marsh. They are also resistant to the liver fluke parasite. Their wool has fibres which are finer than all other breeds of longwool sheep, and is particularly good for hand spinning. A flock book for the breed has been maintained since 1895.

Romney sheep were exported around the world from the early 19th century onwards. The first flocks were sent to New Zealand, where they adapted to their new environment well, and are still the most prolific breed in the country. They have since been shipped to many parts of England, Australia, Patagonia, Canada, Brazil, Portugal, the Falkland Islands and the United States. However, for Downland sheep that were often taken to the marshes to be fattened before sale, 19th-century reports suggest the Romney pastures were highly likely to result in the animals becoming ill with liver fluke and thus their meat becoming contaminated. Whitlaw suggests that this was probably due to the cultivation of buttercups in the region during the 1830s.

== Lookers' huts ==
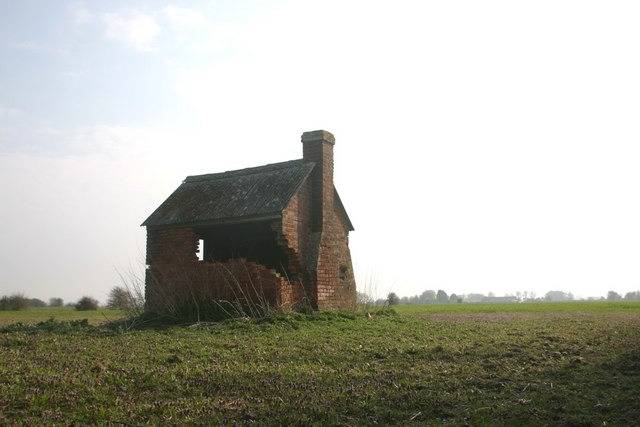
A looker's hut near Brenzett in 2007

In the 18th and 19th centuries, men known as lookers were hired to look after the large flocks of sheep in the expanses of Romney Marsh. The lookers' huts were their temporary accommodation and store for tools. A hut was about 10 feet (3.0 m) square with a tiled roof and a chimney, a small window and a fireplace. The hut was particularly important at lambing time: the looker's family would regularly visit him, bringing supplies for the week.

There were 356 lookers' huts recorded in 1870; the practice of living out on the Marsh at certain times of the year was ending in the 1930s, and few are now left. A hut at Cold Harbour Farm near Brookland, built about 1900, is a Grade II listed building. There is a reconstructed hut at the Visitor Centre in Romney Warren Country Park.

== Romney Marsh Countryside Partnership (RMCP) ==
The Romney Marsh Countryside Partnership was set up in June 1996, as a sister project to the White Cliffs Countryside Partnership. With the help of volunteers, it manages and maintains various sites across the Marsh. The non-profit organisation aims to care for the special landscape and wildlife of the Romney Marsh and Dungeness while encouraging people to enjoy and understand the countryside through volunteer work, guided walks, cycle rides, countryside events and children's activities.

== Malaria ==
In the past, people who lived in the marsh frequently suffered from malaria, then known as ague or marsh fever, which caused high mortality rates until the 1730s. It remained a major problem until the completion of the Royal Military Canal in 1806, which greatly improved the drainage of the area.

This disease probably arrived here with mosquitoes as soon as the weather became warm enough after the end of the Last Glacial Period, around or before the time of the Roman occupation. The strain responsible was most probably Plasmodium vivax, as records and texts describe agues or fevers at three or four-day intervals. Prior Anselm, of nearby Canterbury, recorded in the 1070s and 1080s a case that had every appearance of malaria.

Although five indigenous mosquito species are capable of being hosts for the malarial parasite, only the Anopheles atroparvus species breeds in sufficient numbers here to act as an efficient vector. However, P. vivax likes brackish waters and, with the recreation of the old coastal wetlands coming into favour, this could expand the future malarial parasite host reserve. Together with the average temperatures in England increasing due to climate change, English malaria may become re-established in the marshes.

== Transport ==
=== Roads ===
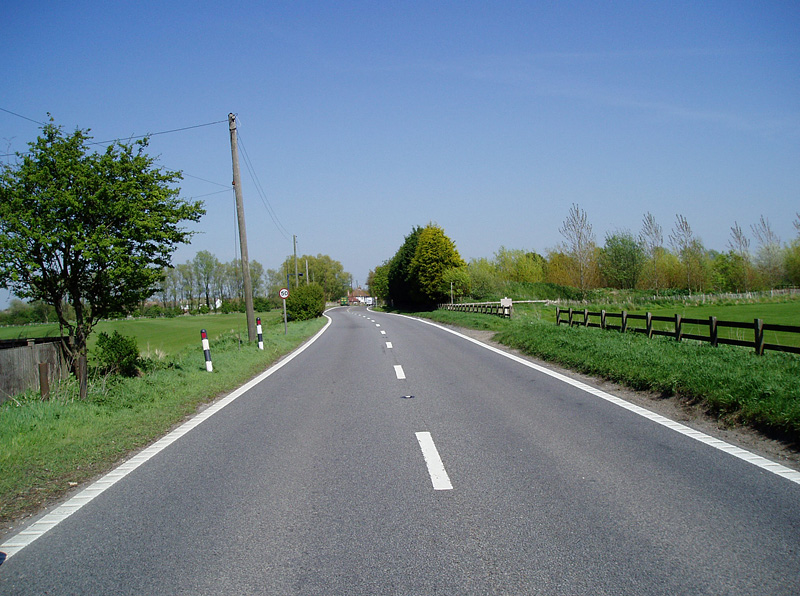
A view along the A259 just outside Brookland, Kent

Roads across the Marsh have always been narrow and winding. This is partly because of the hundreds of sewers and smaller drainage ditches, and because the grazing land is far more important than the roads. The lack of road signs and few villages can make navigating across the marsh very confusing for outsiders. Several minor roads have no finger posts at junctions at all and at others, it is possible to find two or three lanes apparently leading to the same village.

Many of these lanes are built on the remains of enclosures used to "in" the Marsh. There is a dramatic section near Brookland, where a lane linking the Woolpack pub to Lydd is perched 2 or 3 m above the surrounding farmland, on the "Hook" wall. The section of road between Brenzett and Lydd Lane end is built on the Rhee wall, a medieval canal that brought water from higher up the river Rother.

The main road is the A259 from Rye, which is narrow and winding to Brookland and Brenzett, where it splits in two. One arm becomes the A2070 and runs parallel to the railway to link the Marsh to Hamstreet, Ashford and the wider world. The other, still the A259, is good only as far as the junction with Lydd Lane (B2075) and leads to New Romney, Dymchurch, Hythe and eventually, Folkestone.

The local bus routes on the Marsh are operated by Stagecoach in East Kent and link it to Ashford, Canterbury, Dover, Folkestone, Hastings, Northiam and Tenterden.

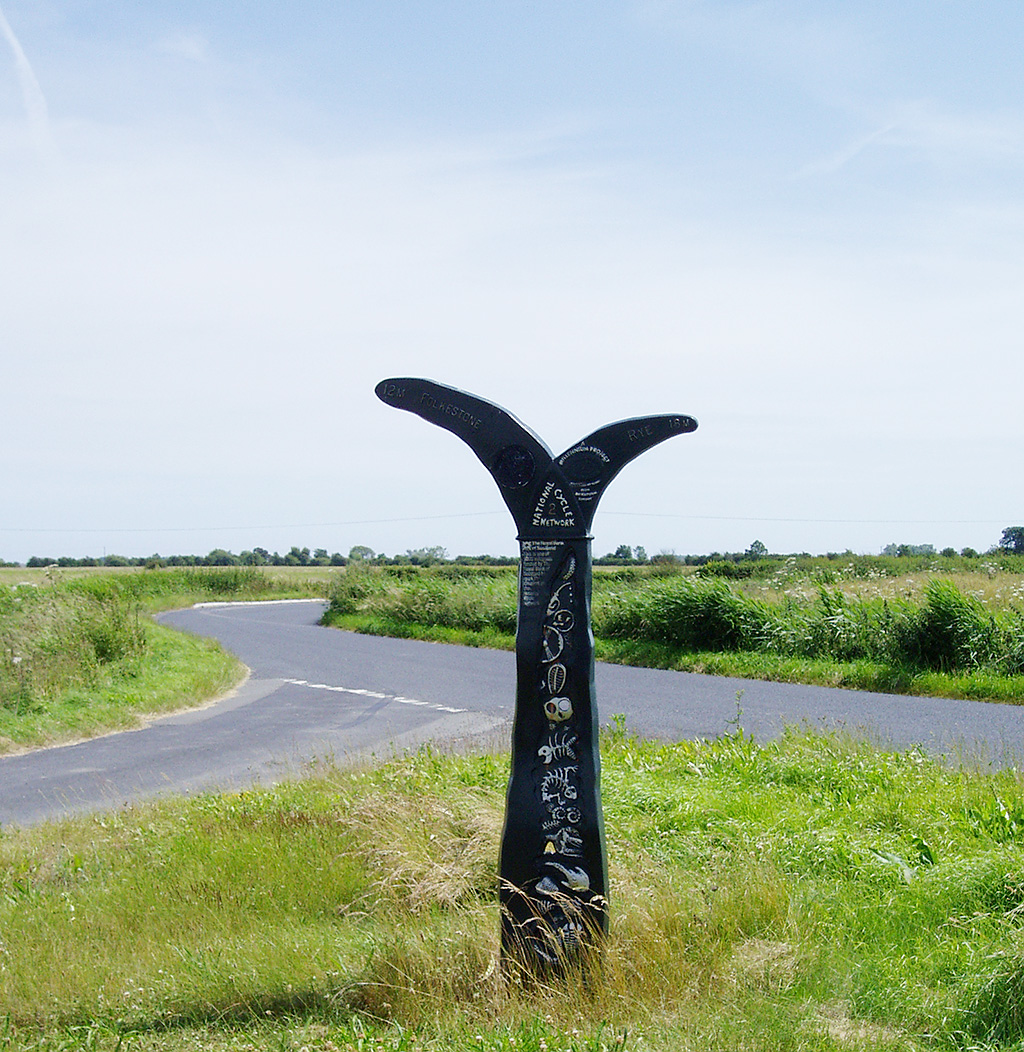
A National Cycle Network signpost on Romney Marsh, indicating Folkestone to the left and Rye to the right

National Cycle Route 2 passes through the area; the section between Rye and Lydd is mostly off-road. From Lydd to Hythe, it uses quiet lanes; from Hythe it is possible to cycle along the sea wall to Folkestone, and ultimately (off-road) to reach Dover.

=== Railways ===
The main line railway known as the Marsh Link Line is the Ashford to Hastings line, with stations at Hamstreet, Appledore, Rye, and Winchelsea. The one-time branch to New Romney from Appledore (its small offshoot to Dungeness closed in 1937) was closed to passenger traffic in 1967. It was possible to travel directly from Dungeness to London, and the 2-hr journey time was quicker than by road and rail today. The line is still in place about a mile short of Dungeness. In the early 21st century, it is used to transfer spent fuel from the nuclear power plant.

The Romney, Hythe and Dymchurch Railway, a 15 in (381 mm)-gauge miniature railway and the only miniature railway in the British Isles ever to have been incorporated under the Light Railways Act 1896, has been operating along the Romney Marsh coast since 1927. It runs for 13.75 miles (22.13 km) from Hythe to Dungeness.

=== Walks ===
The Saxon Shore Way is a long-distance footpath which starts at Gravesend, Kent. It traces the coast as it was in Roman times as far as Hastings, East Sussex. It is 153 miles (246 km) long, and its route crosses the northern edge of the Marsh. The idea for the path was conceived in the 1970s and it was officially opened on 22 June 1980 by the Archbishop of Canterbury.

== The Marsh in war ==
Throughout its history, the proximity of the marsh to the European mainland meant that this area was in the front line whenever invasion threatened. In AD 892, one such invasion was successful. The Danish fleet of 250 ships sailed right into the Rother and took the fortress at Appledore (allegedly built by King Arthur), which they destroyed.

=== Cinque Ports ===
The importance of the Cinque Ports was in their strategic location at the narrowest part of the English Channel. They were important for both trade and defence. Romney and Hythe were two of the ports within the Romney Marsh; Rye and Winchelsea were later added as "Antient Towns". Rye replaced Romney as one of the main five when Romney's port was silted in.

=== Royal Military Canal ===
The Royal Military Canal stretches for 28 miles hugging the old cliff line that borders the Romney Marsh from Hythe in the north east to Cliff End in the south west. It was conceived by Lt-Col Brown of the Royal Staff Corps of field engineers in 1804, the time of the Napoleonic Wars, as a way to ensure that an invasion by the French could not use the marsh as a bridgehead. John Rennie acted as consultant engineer, and the work was completed in April 1809. A military road was built on the inland side of the canal, which consisted of two parts, joined by sections of the River Rother and the River Brede.

=== Martello towers ===
Martello towers are fortifications that were built by the British Army for coastal defence during the early nineteenth century and the Napoleonic Wars. Seventy-four towers were built along the south coast; Tower 1 was at Folkestone, overlooking the harbour, and Tower 74 guarded the beach at Seaford in East Sussex. Six were built in pairs in Dymchurch to protect the Romney Marsh sluices from potential invading French forces. One of these, Martello Tower No. 24 is closest to its original condition, and has its cannon. It is open to the public during the summer months. The towers were built between 1805 and 1808, when Napoleon was a threat.

=== Sound mirrors ===
Prior to World War II, experiments to detect enemy aircraft with huge concrete acoustic mirrors were conducted at Greatstone. The large concrete mirrors were built between 1928 and 1930 as an early warning system in case of approaching German aircraft. While they could detect slow moving aircraft before they were visible, they were less effective as aircraft got faster, and operators struggled to distinguish between aeroplanes and seagoing ships. They were superseded by radar technology in 1935, and abandoned in 1939.

=== Second World War ===
Germany's Operation Sea Lion plan included crossing the flat marsh during an invasion across the English Channel. The government planned to flood the area to prevent troops and equipment from crossing the area. Thousands of concrete pillboxes were built in Kent; 6,500 of the crumbling structures remain standing to this day. The ancient Royal Military Canal was well guarded with troops, pillboxes and barbed wire. Training was provided in the area for the secret Auxiliary Units, men who would be deployed in case of an invasion. Four advanced landing ground airstrips were built on Romney Marsh in 1942, for use by fighters and light bombers; these were used for flights in 1944 against the German flying bombs.

The miniature Romney, Hythe and Dymchurch Railway was used by the government to run armoured trains during construction of Operation Pluto, known as the Pipe Line Under The Ocean. It was to pass under the English Channel, and was intended to supply fuel to the Allied forces that would be involved in Operation Overlord (the 1944 invasion of Normandy).

=== Military training ===
There are two military establishments on the Marsh: the Hythe and Lydd Ranges. The latter has a large danger area marked on maps south of Lydd towards the sea. The Metropolitan Police also have a substantial facility just outside Lydd, where a mock urban 'townscape' complete with full-size houses, streets, etc., provides an appropriate environment for counter-terrorism and civil disorder training.

== "Lost villages" of the Marsh ==
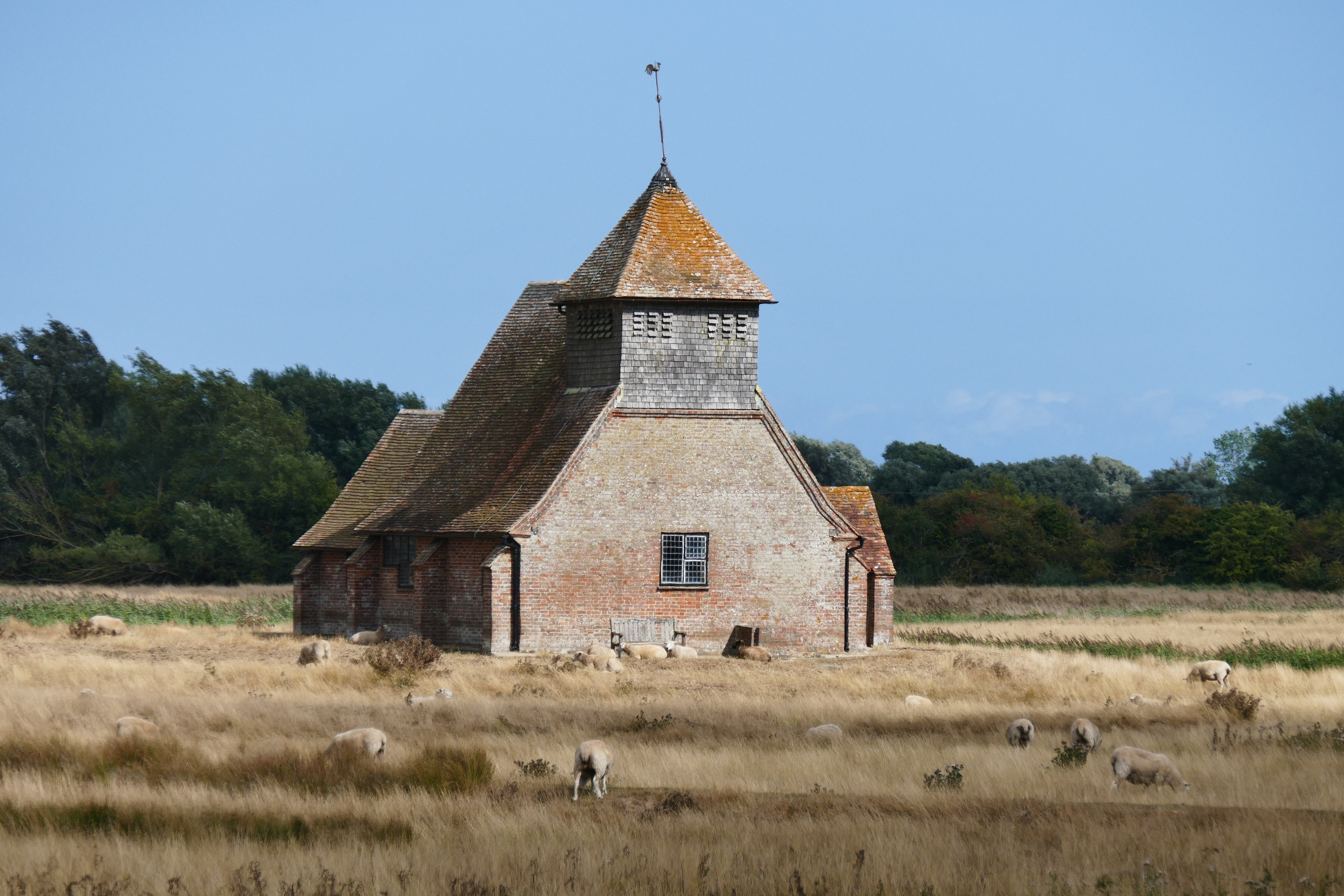
St Thomas à Becket church, Fairfield

Some of the lost communities on the Marsh are instances of the modern decline of the rural communities; others occurred over the centuries. In 1348, for example, many villages were decimated by the Black Death. The few survivors moved to other places.

The villages, shown below with the modern Ordnance Survey map information on Sheet 189, were:

- Blackmanstone: Blackmanstone Bridge, over one of the larger marsh drains grid reference TR071296
- Dengemarsh: south of Lydd; the village was closed when the government opened the Lydd ranges in WWII [not marked on OS Map: ?TR 0417]
- Eastbridge: Eastbridge House, on Dymchurch to Bonnington road: the road is named Eastbridge Road out of Dymchurch. Remains: large part of west wall of the tower, some other fragments. Village had a population of 21 (1801 Census). grid reference TR078319
- Fairfield: NW of Brookland grid reference TQ977270
- Falconhurst: a house north of the Royal Military Canal six miles west of Hythe. grid reference TR076344
- Galloways: south of Lydd, village was closed when the Lydd ranges were opened in WWII [not marked on OS Map: ?TR 0017]
- Hope All Saints: Hope Farm, NW of New Romney. The remains of the church are marked on the map. (See Romney Marsh Gazeteer) grid reference TR049258

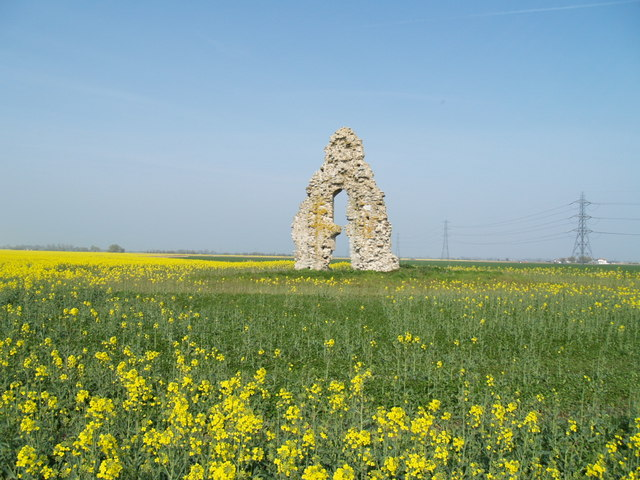
The ruins of Midley Church

- Midley: Midley Cottages, SW of Old Romney grid reference TR016237 This was once a small island in the Rother between the larger ones of Romney and Lydd, and the name means "middle island". In the 8th century there was a village on this site, and 23 people still lived here in 1801. Now, only the ruined west wall of the church remains. During World War II, an RAF airfield was built and operated here.
- Orgarswick: Orgarswick Farm, NW of Dymchurch grid reference TR090309
- Snave: Although the church still stands, it is used only once a year for a harvest festival service. Today it falls under the Hamstreet group of churches. (See Romney Marsh Gazeteer) grid reference TR015299

== Smuggling ==
The flat, almost empty landscape and numerous waterways created an ideal environment for smuggling from the 17th until the early 19th century. The traffic was two-way, since wool was smuggled from this area to the Continent.

The main gangs on the Marsh were the Hawkhurst Gang, the Mayfield Gang, and the Aldington Gang, known also as "the Blues".

Smugglers on the Marshes were known as Owlers. The name was rumoured to be derived from the owl-like sounds they used to communicate at night.

== Literary associations ==
Romney Marsh has been represented in a distinguished literary history. Three authors who specifically used the marsh as settings for their works were E. F. Benson, author of the Mapp and Lucia novels; Russell Thorndike, author of the Doctor Syn novels; and the children's writer Monica Edwards, author of Romney Marsh books. She changed the name of Rye Harbour to "Westling", Rye is renamed "Dunsford", and Winchelsea is known as "Winklesea".

Rosemary Sutcliff's 1955 historical novel Outcast depicts Roman efforts to build the Rhee Wall and reclaim land from the sea. A fictitious Romney Marsh estate near Charbury is a key setting in The Eagle Has Flown (1991) by Jack Higgins, the quasi-sequel to The Eagle Has Landed. Both are related to World War II. The latter novel was adapted as a successful motion picture starring Michael Caine.

Modern-day novelist George Chittenden captures smuggling on the Kent coast in his highly praised debut children's novel, The Boy Who Led Them (2012). It follows the rise and fall of a smuggling gang leader in Deal, Kent, a notorious smuggling town further down the coast.

Many other well-known writers have been associated with the area: Henry James lived in Rye; Daphne du Maurier lived in Hythe for a few years during World War II; H. G. Wells, Joseph Conrad, Ford Madox Ford, Stephen Crane, Radclyffe Hall, Noël Coward, Edith Nesbit, Rumer Godden, Malcolm Saville, and Conrad Aiken also lived in marsh towns. Aiken's daughter, Joan Aiken, set her children's book, Cold Shoulder Road, in Romney Marsh. Rudyard Kipling and his poem, "A Smugglers' Song", are also associated with the 18th-century Sussex smugglers.

According to Norman Wright's book The Famous Five: Everything You Ever Wanted to Know, Rye's history inspired Enid Blyton when she wrote Five Go to Smuggler's Top.

The 1947 British historical drama film The Loves of Joanna Godden, based on the novel by Sheila Kaye-Smith and directed by Charles Frend, is set in Romney Marsh.

The 1963 a three-part television series entitled The Scarecrow of Romney Marsh, was produced for the Walt Disney's Wonderful World of Color TV series. It described the adventures of Dr. Syn. Parts of it were filmed at St Clement's Church in Old Romney, Romney Marsh. The three-part series was edited into a motion picture and released in the United Kingdom and subsequently Europe, Central America and South America. It debuted on American television in 1964.

In 2023, English author K.J. Charles published The Secret Lives of Country Gentlemen, a historical romance set on Romney Marsh and featuring smuggling. This was followed by a sequel titled The Nobleman's Guide to Seducing a Scoundrel, also set on the marsh.

== Noted people ==
- Clifford Earl, actor - (1933-2015).

Earl was also one of the volunteer soldiers who in 1953 took part in the Porton Down experiments for what they believed was research on the common cold, when actually Sarin was being tested.

== See also ==
- The Fens of East Anglia and the Somerset Levels, for other wetlands in England.
- Geology of Great Britain § Holocene epoch

== Bibliography ==
- Brooks, Nicholas (1988). Romney Marsh in the Early Middle Ages. In Eddison & Green 1988
- Campbell, Jim (18 October 2005). "Application for consent to construct and operate a wind turbine generating station at Little Cheyne Count, Walland Marsh, Kent" (PDF). Folkestone and Hythe Council (for DTI). Archived (PDF) from the original on 4 July 2024.
- Eddison, Jill; Green, Christopher, eds. (1988). Romney Marsh: Evolution, Occupation, Reclamation. Oxford University Committee for Archaeology. ISBN 978-0-947816-24-7.
- Hadfield, Charles (1969). The Canals of South and South-East England. David and Charles. ISBN 978-0-7153-4693-8.
- Ingoldsby, Thomas (2001) [1858]. The Ingoldsby Legends. Adamant Media Corporation. ISBN 978-0-543-87236-4.
- Middlemass, Thomas (1991). Encyclopaedia of Narrow Gauge Railways. Guild Publishing. ISBN 978-1-85260-270-3.
- Tatton-Brown, Tim (1988). The Topography of the Walland Marsh area between the 11th and 13th Centuries. In Eddison & Green 1988
