= Snargate =

Village in Kent, England

Coordinates: 51.0226°N 0.837°E

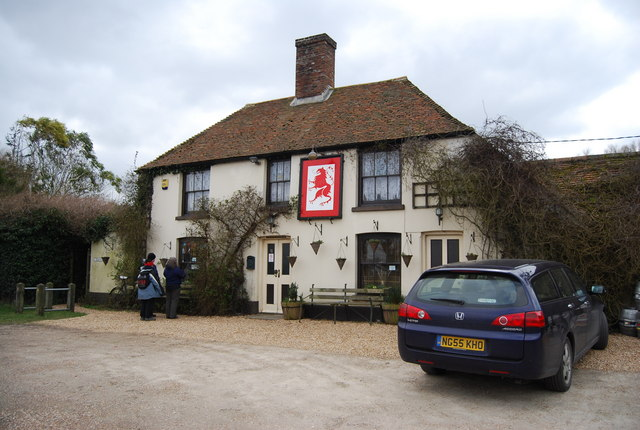
- The Red Lion

- Location within Kent
- Population: 134 (2011)
- OS grid reference: TQ956295
- District: Folkestone and Hythe
- Shire county: Kent
- Region: South East
- Country: England
- Sovereign state: United Kingdom
- Post town: Romney Marsh
- Postcode district: TN29
- Police: Kent
- Fire: Kent
- Ambulance: South East Coast
- UK Parliament: Folkestone and Hythe

Snargate is a village in Kent, England, four miles West of New Romney and on the route of the old watercourse Rhee Wall. The name is derived from sluice gates that were used to control water levels on the Rhee. St Dunstan Church, dating from around 1200, was (like other isolated churches in this area) associated with smuggling.

Cleric and novelist Richard Barham (aka Thomas Ingoldsby) was ordained in 1813 and found a curacy at Snargate, marrying Caroline Smart the following year. While there he wrote his first novel Baldwin, published in 1820, which was unsuccessful. He began his second novel, My Cousin Nicholas, though this was not published until 1834. Barham moved to London in 1821, but remained vicar of Snargate until 1824 when he was appointed as rector of St Mary Magdalen and St Gregory by St Paul's, living at Amen Corner in St Paul's Churchyard.

Snargate was home to artist Harold Gilman, sometimes called the English Van Gogh. He was a British Impressionist and a member of the Camden Town Group. He grew up at Snargate Rectory, where his father was rector. Harold was born in 1876, and lived at the Rectory till his thirties, when he brought his bride Grace to live there, for the first two years of their marriage, 1902–04. His father retired to Reigate Surrey and died there in 1917. Harold Gilman only lived two years longer, dying in 1919 as one of the numerous victims of the so-called Spanish Influenza outbreak at the end of the First World War.

The painting "Interior" of about 1908 (Private Collection) is supposed to have been painted inside the Rectory.

Snargate has a well known pub, The Red Lion, which originates from the early 16th century and has been run by the current family since 1911 and, except for the odd lick of paint, has not been redecorated since 1890. This is a tiny pub with an antique marble bar top and bare wooden floor. The draught beers, principally from independent Kentish brewers, are served directly from the cask. The walls are decorated with World War II era memorabilia. The pub, run by Doris Jemison until her death in April 2016 and now by her daughter Kate, has won a number of awards including CAMRA's Ashford Folkestone and Romney Marsh Branch Pub of the Year, the Kent CAMRA Pub of the Year, and the South East Regional Pub of the Year. It is a Grade II listed public house, and is on the Campaign for Real Ale's National Inventory of Historic Pub Interiors.
