= Brookland, Kent =

Village in Kent, England

Coordinates: 50.999°N 0.837°E

Brookland
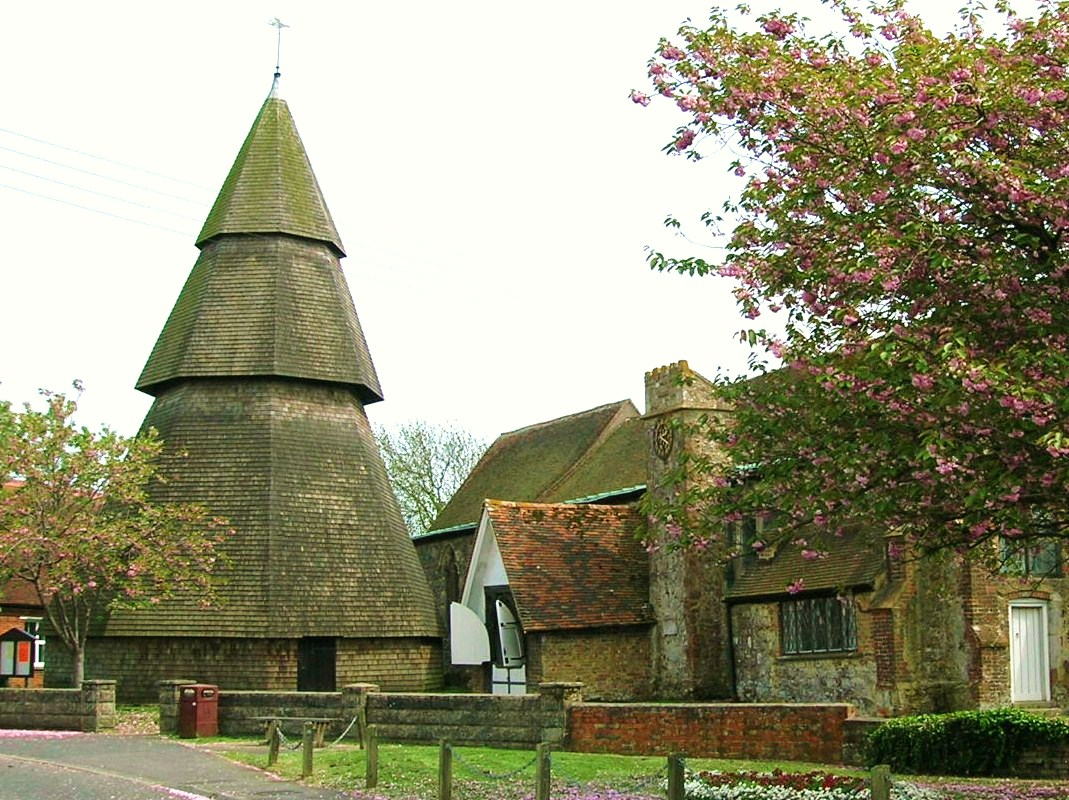
- Church of St Augustine, Brookland

- Location within Kent
- Population: 479 (2011)
- OS grid reference: TQ990259
- District: Folkestone and Hythe
- Shire county: Kent
- Region: South East
- Country: England
- Sovereign state: United Kingdom
- Post town: Romney Marsh
- Postcode district: TN29
- Police: Kent
- Fire: Kent
- Ambulance: South East Coast
- UK Parliament: Folkestone and Hythe

Brookland is a village and civil parish in the Folkestone and Hythe district of Kent, England, about 5 miles (8 km) west of New Romney. According to the 2001 census the parish had a population of 453, increasing to 479 at the 2011 Census. It is located on the A259 road in Romney Marsh and become popular with visitors heading to the Laughing Frog Teas Rooms.

== History ==
=== St Augustine's Church ===
The parish Church of St Augustine has the unusual, if not unique, feature of an entirely wooden spire being separate from the body of the church. Popular myth is that the steeple looked down at a wedding service to see such a beautiful bride marrying such an unpleasant groom that it jumped off the church in shock. A more popular story is that one day a virgin presented herself to be married and the church spire fell off at the unusual occurrence. In fact, it is separate as the weight can not be supported by the marshy ground.

Inside the church there is a round lead font dating from the 12th century. Around its circumference are panels with reliefs showing the 12 Zodiac signs and the typical labours of each month.

=== Battle of Brookland ===
In 1816, when the conclusion of the wars with France made it possible to take steps to deal with smuggling on Romney Marsh, a Coast Blockade was established along the coast of Kent; the smugglers in response organized themselves into armed gangs, and became increasingly audacious. On the night of 11 February 1821 members of the Aldington Gang, landing goods at Camber, were spotted by the Blockade Sentinel, and were pursued across the marsh by the Blockaders. An officer was killed, a mile from Brookland, and two assistants wounded; four smugglers were killed and sixteen wounded. The event became known as the Battle of Brookland. There was a trial at the Old Bailey, which aroused great interest, and the smugglers' leader Cephas Quested was executed.

== Amenities ==
As late as 1970 the village had a post office, five shops - including Coleman's, a butcher well known locally for his pork sausages - a tea room, a garage, blacksmith, abattoir, a vicar and three pubs. The Alliance and Royal Oak pubs have closed; the Woolpack Inn continues to operate 1 mile (1.6 km) south of the village. The nearest general stores are now at Appledore (5 miles (8 km)), Hamstreet (6 miles (10 km)) and New Romney (6 miles (10 km)).
