= Gebel =

Gebel may refer to:

== Places ==
- Gebel Edmonstone, a mesa in Egypt
- Gebel Elba, a peak in Egypt
- Gebel el-Haridi, an archaeological site in Egypt
- Gebel el-Silsila, an archaeological quarry site in Egypt
- Gebel Ramlah, an archaeological site in Egypt
- Ġebel San Pietru, a hill in Malta
- Gebel Tingar, small mountain in Egypt
- Gebel-al-Tarik (Mountain of Tarik), the Arabic name for Gibraltar
- Tuna el-Gebel, the necropolis of Khmun

== Other ==
- Gebel (surname), Turkish and German surname
- Gebel el-Arak Knife, an ivory and flint knife
- Gebel Kamil (meteorite)
- Gebel, a fictional character in Bloodstained: Ritual of the Night and its companion game Bloodstained: Curse of the Moon

== See also ==
- Jabal (disambiguation)
