= Georg Gebel =

Georg Gebel was the name of two German musicians and composers:

- Georg Gebel (the elder) (1685–1750)
- Georg Gebel (the younger) (1709–1753), his son
