= Gebel (surname) =

Gebel is Turkish and German surname.

Notable people with this surname include:

- Dante Gebel (born 1968), Argentine pastor and talk show host
- Else Gebel (1905–1964), German communist resistance fighter
- Franz Xaver Gebel (1787–1843), German musician
- Georg Gebel (the younger) (1709–1753), German musician
- Georg Gebel (the elder) (1685–1750), German musician
- Gunther Gebel-Williams (1934–2001), German animal trainer
- Kathrin Gebel (born 1997), German politician
- Małgorzata Gebel (born 1955), Polish actress
- Silke Gebel (born 1983), German politician
- Titus Gebel (born 1967), German entrepreneur and political activist
- Viggo Gebel (born 2007), German footballer
