= Il-Widna =

Acoustic Mirror in Malta

Coordinates: 35°55′51″N 14°26′36″E

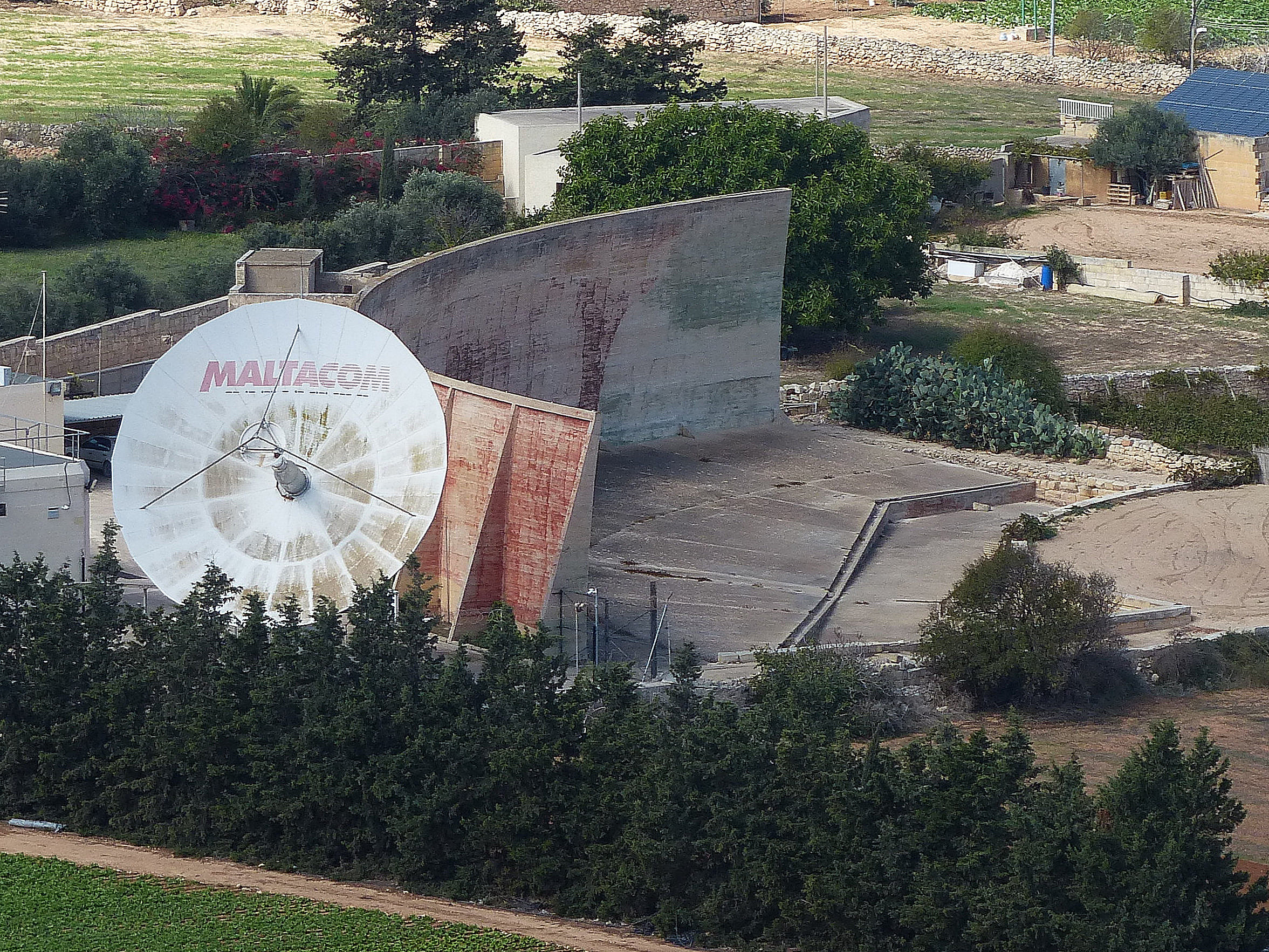
The acoustic mirror

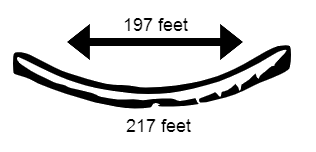
A sketch of the acoustic mirror

Il-Widna is a large acoustic mirror located in Magħtab, Malta. The colloquial name of the acoustic mirror refers to ear in Maltese. The mirror is 200 feet (61 m) long, approximately the same design as the sound Mirror in RAF Denge. The mirror was used during the Axis bombardment of Malta during the Second World war to detect incoming Luftwaffe (1941-1942) and Regia Aeronautica (1940-1941) bombers seeking to airstrike Malta. Il-Widna faces towards the island of Sicily, in Italy at a bearing of around 20 degrees. The mirror is also the only acoustic not built in the UK. Il-Widna was built between the autumn of 1934 and the summer of 1935. The required electrical equipment was installed in the first weeks of September 1935. The total cost of the development of the mirror on Malta was put at £4500. Tests making use of a flying boat found that the range of the mirror was around 25 miles (40 km). It was estimated that the mirror would provide a six minute warning of an enemy aircraft approaching Malta at 250 miles per hour (220 kn).
