= Parabolic microphone =

Directional audio recording instrument

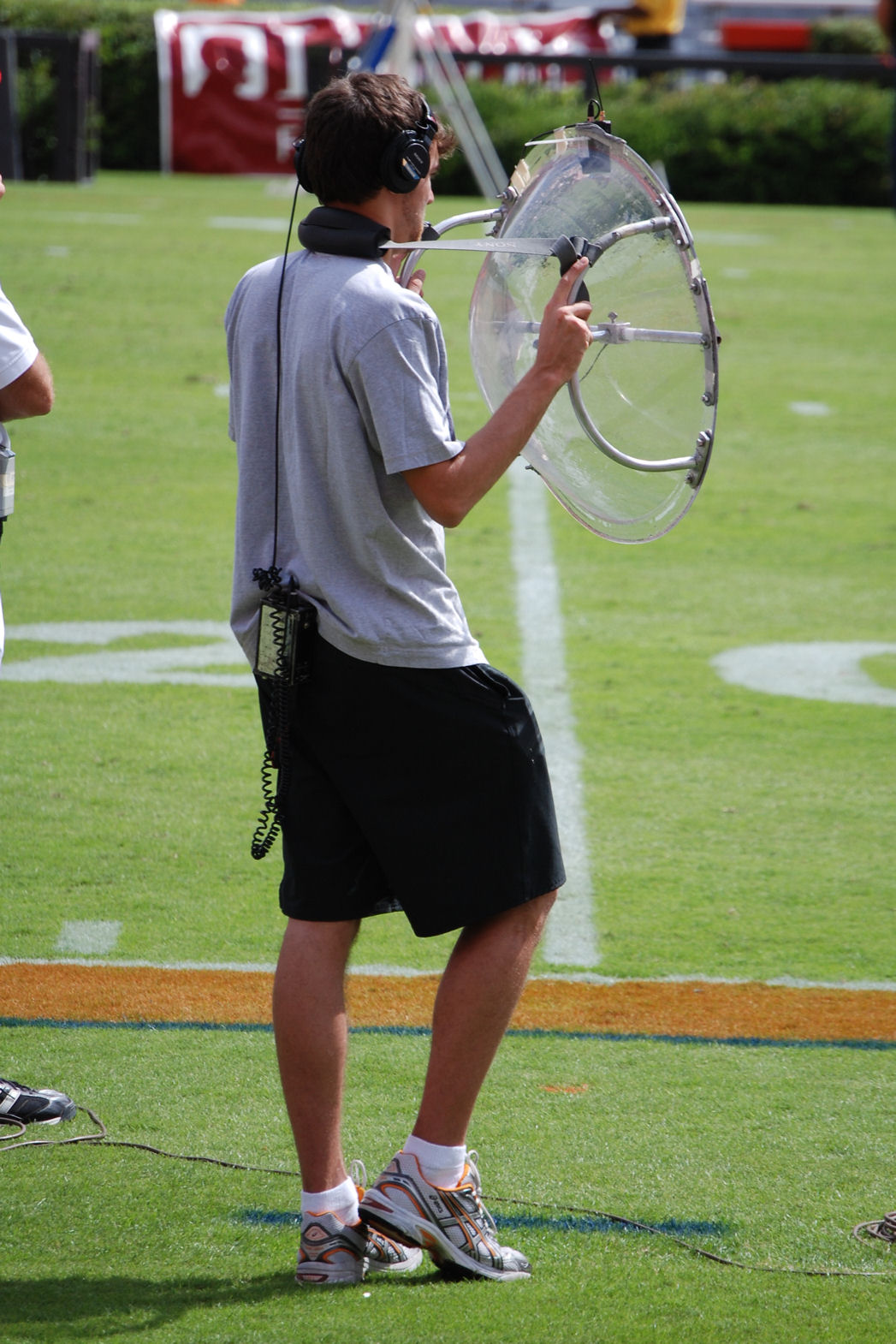
Parabolic microphone used at an American college football game.

A parabolic microphone is a microphone that uses a parabolic reflector to collect and focus sound waves onto a transducer, in much the same way that a parabolic antenna (e.g. satellite dish) does with radio waves. Though they lack high fidelity, parabolic microphones have great sensitivity to sounds coming from one direction, along the axis of the dish, and can pick up distant sounds.

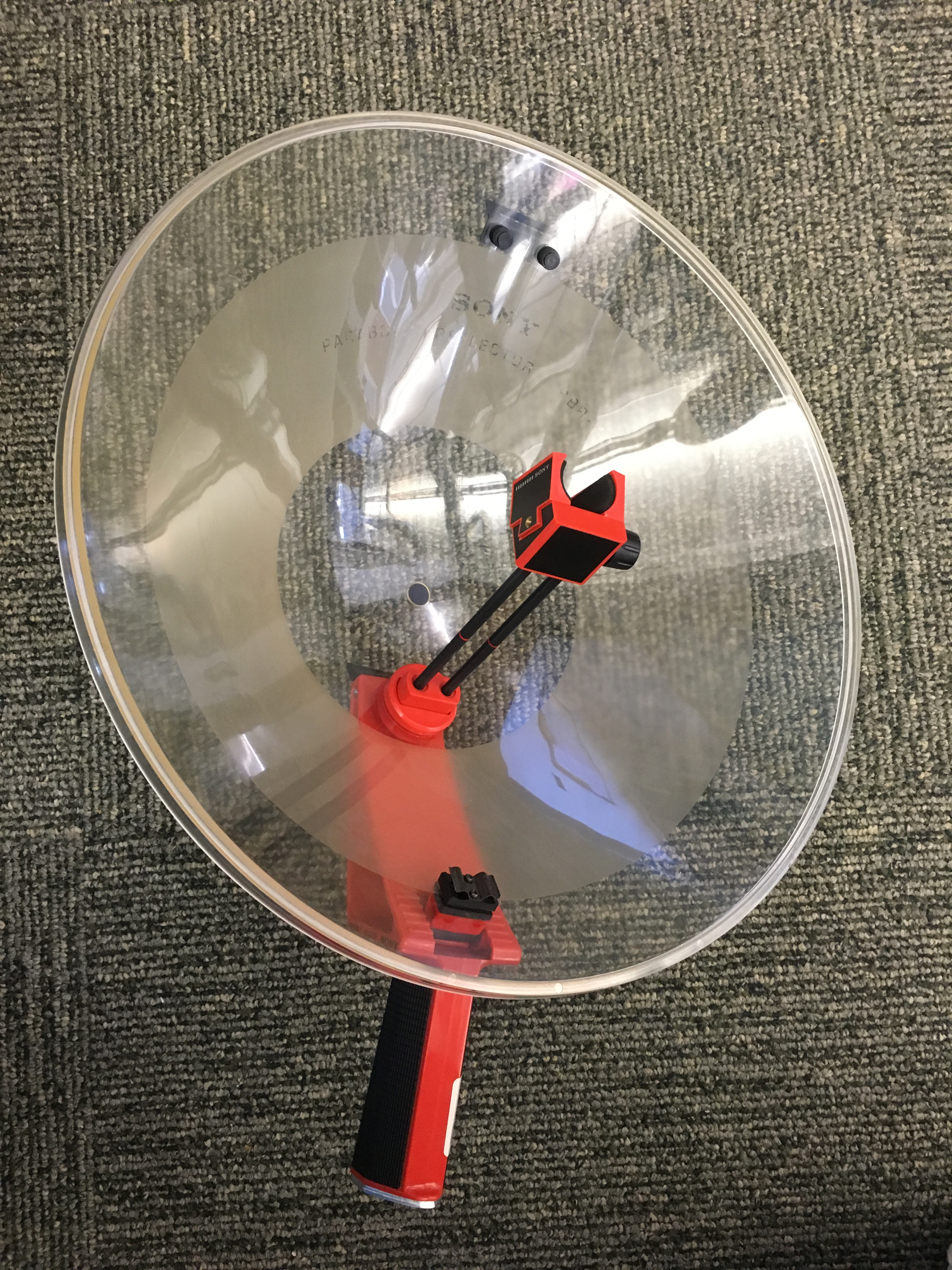
A Sony parabolic reflector, without a microphone. The microphone would face the reflector surface and sound captured by the reflector would bounce towards the microphone.

== Limitations ==
Parabolic microphones are generally not used for high-fidelity applications because dishes small enough to be portable have poor low-frequency response. This is because, from the Rayleigh criterion, parabolic dishes can only focus waves with a wavelength much smaller than the diameter of their aperture. The wavelength of sound waves at the low end of human hearing (20 Hz) is about 17 metres (56 ft); focusing them would require a dish much larger than this. A typical parabolic microphone dish with a diameter of one metre has little directivity for sound waves longer than 30 cm, corresponding to frequencies below 1 kHz. For higher frequencies, a gain of about 15 dB can be expected. But when the wavelength of the sound becomes comparable with the diameter of the parabolic dish, the response falls away.

A shotgun microphone, or a phased array of microphones, may be used as an alternative for applications requiring directional selectivity with high fidelity.

== Applications ==
Typical uses of this microphone include nature sound recording such as recording bird calls, field audio for sports broadcasting, and eavesdropping on conversations, for example in espionage and law enforcement. Parabolic microphones were used in many parts of the world as early as World War II, especially by the Japanese.

Parabolic microphones are also used by search and rescue teams to locate lost people in wilderness environments. This application is supported by a study comparing parabolic microphones to unaided hearing in detecting and comprehending calling subjects at distances out to 2500 meters.

== See also ==
- Acoustic location
- Acoustic mirror
