= William Sansome Tucker =

English audio engineer (1877–1965)

Major William Sansome Tucker OBE (1877 Kidderminster, Worcestershire – 1965 Guelph, Ontario, Canada) was an English pioneer in acoustical research and inventor of the acoustic mirror.

== Early life ==
Tucker was born in Kidderminster, the son of William Tucker, an artist painter, and his wife Anna. Tucker married in Chorlton-on-Medlock, Lancashire, in 1906.

== Career ==
Tucker lectured on physics in London. Following the outbreak of World War I, Tucker joined the British Army as a private soldier. He was posted to the Experimental Sound Ranging Station at Kemmel Hill in Belgium which was under the command of Lawrence Bragg. As part of the London Electrical Engineers, Territorial Force, Tucker was granted a commission, being promoted from lance corporal to temporary second lieutenant, General List in April 1916.

At Kemmel Hill, Tucker undertook research into 'sound ranging': the process of using microphones and mathematics to determine the position of enemy artillery. Bragg had been wracked by doubts and problems with the military command structure. Tucker formed an experimental sound ranging section, which spearheaded the development of an effective system of sound ranging enemy guns. Vital to the success was Tucker's invention of a 'hot wire' microphone, capable of identifying the shell sound wave and the following report of the gun that fired it. The breakthrough had come from Bragg, who found that the water closet at the farmhouse where he was billeted, allowed him, once seated inside, to detect sound and pressure differences of shell waves and gun waves as they passed overhead.

Tucker researched how to cool platinum wire with the air currents caused by the sound-waves they were detecting. Mouse-holes and rum jars provided a clue here, as there were two mouse-holes by Tucker's bed and he noticed a draught of cool air whenever the gun-wave arrived. Tucker devised a microphone consisting of a thin, electrically heated wire, stretched over a small hole in a container (he used rum jars, but the low-frequency acoustic resonance of wooden ammunition boxes, forming a Helmholtz resonator, was soon found to give better results). The decrease in the electrical resistance of the wire as the gun-wave struck was recorded by a Wheatstone bridge and galvanometer.

Tucker had to send for platinum wire to be delivered to him at Kemmel Hill, before he could run trials. The rapid oscillations of the shell waves had almost no effect on the wire, whilst the gun-reports resulted in well-defined 'breaks' on the 35mm cine film used to record the oscillations, due to the deflection of the wire by the pressure of the gun wave. By September 1916, Tucker's new microphones had been supplied to all sound-ranging sections.

In 1917, sound-ranging was further developed so that allowances could be made for poor weather conditions, as sudden gusts of wind could cool the wire: the most effective method found was to wrap the devices in several layers of camouflage netting. Tucker developed a system of moveable microphones to improve detection techniques, allowing for a high degree of accuracy in determining the position of the enemy guns. By the end of the war it was possible to determine where the gun was pointing, and how large it was. The technique could also be extended to listen out for enemy aircraft; as a result, Tucker became Director of Acoustical Research, Air Defence Experimental Establishment, Biggin Hill.

His work eventually led to vast parabolic 'sound mirrors' being constructed from concrete. Some of these sound mirrors still survive along England's south coast, such as those to be found at Denge, near Dungeness, to the west side of a lake slightly north of Lydd-on-Sea, and others uncovered in 2014 at Fan Bay near Dover. Tucker's work was superseded by the development of radar, which made sound-ranging using the great concrete mirrors obsolete. Some known locations for the sound mirrors were documented in a series of photographs by Joe Pettet-Smith in 2018.

Continuing Application of Tucker’s Work

Tucker's excellent paper at Reference [7] had relevance beyond the close of WW1, &WW2. Typically in Gun Sound Ranging, systems of up to 6 spaced microphones were connected to a Command Post, by individual cables. In battlefield scenarios such as those in WW1 particularly, these long field cables were vulnerable to damage, hence time was taken up affecting repairs when at all possible, in order to maintain an effective location service. In Britain in the 1960s, a sound-ranging system was devised using radio links in place of the cables, and also replacing the hot-wire microphones with robust microphones of wider sonic bandwidth. The system was much easier to deploy and maintain than that with cable links. This location system provided a choice between two signal outputs at the Command Post, one for feeding the then currently in-service recorders, the other for the provision of anticipated processors of wider sonic frequency-range. The optimum response for the in-service recorders was achieved by filtering the wider band received detections, so as to remove unwanted lower frequencies such as sounds arising from wind noise, and to reduce the clutter stemming from higher frequency noise. The electronic output-filter in this system was designed to follow a frequency response similar to that of Tucker's Helmholtz Resonator, the details of which are identified in his impressive paper. This provided the optimum frequency response for gun location in the field, as confirmed during a series of trials. This ‘wireless’ sound ranging system was developed and manufactured by The Plessey Company Ltd. at Ilford. As to usage in more recent times, in practice the nature of the terrain may be a factor in determining the choice between location of guns by sound ranging, or by radar. This brief entry augments the Wikipedia article "Artillery Sound Ranging".
