= Dover Strait coastal guns =

Artillery batteries

Coordinates: 51°00′00″N 01°27′00″E

- Part of British coast defences/Atlantikwall
- English Channel; Near Dover/Calais in Britain/occupied France
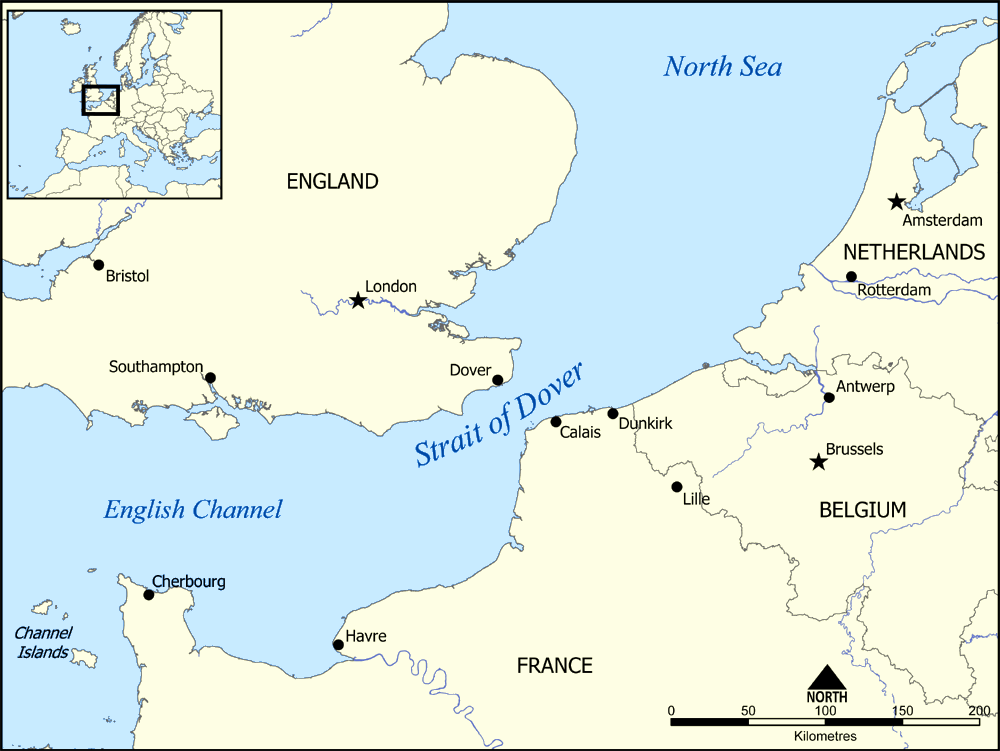
- Strait of Dover

Site information
- Operator: Dover Command/Kriegsmarine
- Controlled by: British Army/German Navy
- Condition: Museum pieces or demolished

Site history
- Built: 1940
- Built by: British civilian contractors/Organisation Todt
- In use: 1944
- Materials: Steel-reinforced concrete
- Fate: Defunct
- Battles/wars: Channel convoys Channel Dash; Operation Undergo
- Events: Battle of Britain; Normandy landings

The Dover Strait coastal guns were long-range coastal artillery batteries that were sited on both sides of the English Channel during the Second World War. The British built several gun positions along the coast of Kent, England while the Germans fortified the Pas-de-Calais in occupied France. The Strait of Dover was strategically important because it is the narrowest part of the English channel. Batteries on both sides attacked shipping as well as bombarding the coastal towns and military installations. The German fortifications would be incorporated into the Atlantic Wall which was built between 1942 and 1944.

== German installations ==
After the Fall of France in June 1940, Adolf Hitler personally discussed the possibility of invasion with Großadmiral (Grand Admiral) Erich Raeder, the Commander-in-Chief of the Kriegsmarine (German Navy) on 21 May 1940. Almost a month later on 25 June he ordered Oberkommando der Wehrmacht (OKW, supreme command of the armed forces) to begin preparation and feasibility studies, which had to be completed by 2 July, for the invasion of Britain. In an OKW directive on 10 July, operational coastal batteries under the control of the Kriegsmarine would support the invasion fleet.

All preparations are to be made to provide strong frontal and flank artillery protection for the transportation and landing of troops in case of a possible crossing from the coastal strip Calais–Cape Gris Nez–Boulogne.

— Field Marshal Wilhelm Keitel

On 16 July Hitler issued Führer Directive 16 to have guns in place to support Operation Sea Lion:

Strong forces of coastal artillery must command and protect the forward coastal area.

— Adolf Hitler 16 July 1940

Commencing on 22 July 1940, Organisation Todt began work on artillery positions primarily at Pas-de-Calais for every heavy artillery piece available; the batteries were required to be capable of withstanding the heaviest bombardments.

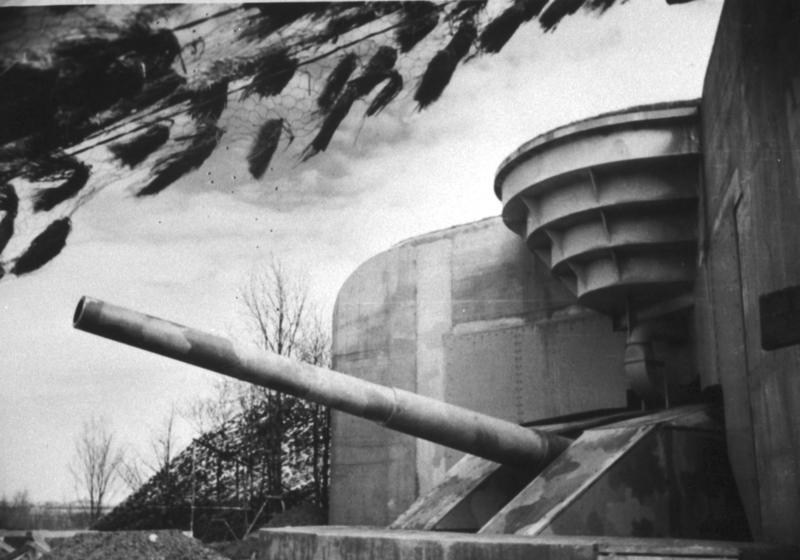
Batterie Todt was part of the Atlantic Wall.

The first German guns began to be installed around the end of July 1940. The German batteries in order of construction were:

- Siegfried Battery at Audinghen, south of Cap Gris-Nez, with one 38 cm SK C/34 naval gun (15-inch) gun (later increased to 4 and renamed Todt Battery), shortly followed by:
- Three 30.5 cm (12.0 in) guns at Friedrich August Battery, to the north of Boulogne-sur-Mer
- Four 28 cm (11 in) guns at Grosser Kurfürst Battery at Cap Gris-Nez
- Two 21 cm (8.3 in) guns at Prinz Heinrich Battery just outside Calais
- Two 21 cm (8.3 in) guns at Oldenburg Battery in Calais
- Three 40.6 cm SK C/34 (16-inch) guns (from among the so-called Adolf Guns) at Lindemann Battery between Calais and Cap Blanc-Nez. The battery was named Lindemann after the fallen captain of the battleship Bismarck.

These guns were supplemented by a number of railway guns operated by the German Army (Heer). These comprised six 28 cm (11 in) K5 guns and a single 21 cm (8.3 in) K12 gun with a range of 115 km (71 mi), which could only be used against land targets, and a further thirteen 28 cm (11 in) guns and five 24 cm (9.4 in) guns, plus additional motorised batteries comprising twelve 24 cm (9.4 in) guns and ten 21 cm (8.3 in) guns; these could be fired at shipping but were of limited effectiveness due to their slow traverse speed, long loading time and ammunition types. The longest-ranged guns were two 21 cm (8.3 in) K12 (E) railway guns, manned by the Army. These guns had an effective range of 45 km (28 mi). Designed as successors to the World War I Paris gun, they had a maximum range of 115 km (71 mi). Shell fragments were found near Chatham, Kent, about 88 km (55 mi) from the French coast. Both guns, which were operated by Artillerie-Batterie 701 (E), remained on the Channel Coast until the Liberation of France in July 1944.

By early August, Siegfried Battery and Grosser Kurfürst Battery were fully operational as were all of the Army's railway guns. The first shells landed in the Dover area during the second week of August 1940.

Land-based guns have always been feared by navies because they are on a stationary platform and are thus more accurate (and can be larger, with more ammunition stowage) than those on board ships. Super-heavy railway guns can only be traversed by moving the entire gun and its carriage along a curved track, or by building a special cross track or turntable. This, combined with their slow rate of fire (measured in rounds per hour or even rounds per day), makes it difficult for them to hit moving targets. Another problem with super-heavy guns is that their barrels (which are difficult to make and expensive to replace) wear out relatively quickly, so they could not be fired often.

Better suited for use against naval targets were the four heavy naval batteries installed by mid-September: Friedrich August, Prinz Heinrich, Oldenburg and Siegfried (later renamed Todt) – a total of eleven guns, with the firepower of a battlecruiser. Fire control for these guns was provided by both spotter aircraft and by DeTeGerät radar sets installed at Blanc-Nez and Cap d'Alprech. These units were capable of detecting targets out to a range of 40 km (25 mi), including small British patrol craft near the English coast. Two additional radar sites were added by mid-September: a DeTeGerät at Cap de la Hague and a FernDeTeGerät long-range radar at Cap d'Antifer near Le Havre.

From their establishment in August 1940 and for the following two years one out of every five Channel convoys was fired upon, with an average of 29 rounds on each occasion. No convoys at all were fired on in 1943, though shelling resumed sporadically in 1944. During the whole period up to the Normandy landings no ship was hit, though some damage was done by near misses. Hewitt reports that the only success achieved by these batteries was in June 1944 when the Sambut was hit, and sank with the loss of 130 of the troops on board. Some sources report a second ship, Empire Lough, from convoy ETC 17, was also sunk by gunfire on 24 June, though others attribute the loss to an attack by E-boats.

Most of the batteries continued firing until September 1944 when they were overrun during the clearing of the Channel Coast. By then more than a thousand rounds had been fired by the German coastal batteries against England and shipping.

== British emplacements ==
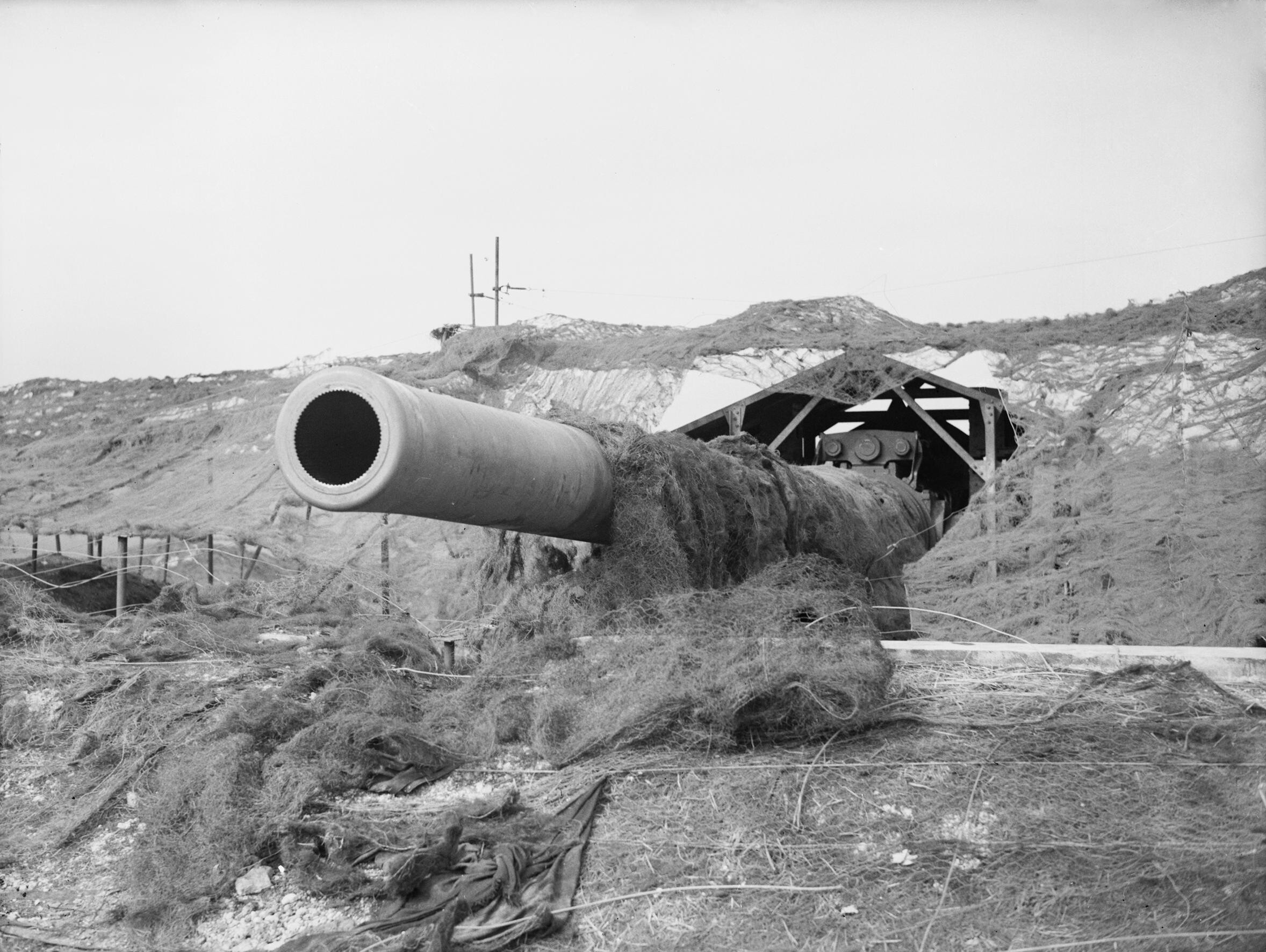
"Winnie", a 14-inch gun at St Margaret's at Cliffe near Dover, March 1941

Having withdrawn in the Dunkirk evacuation and winning the Battle of Britain, the British did not have an immediate answer to the threat posed by the German coastal batteries. However, the high ground to either side of the Port of Dover was fortified on the personal order of Prime Minister Winston Churchill (who had visited the area to see the situation in person) and wanted large calibre guns dug in there. The only British cross-Channel guns already in place were two BL 14 inch Mk VII (35.6 cm) guns Winnie (named after Churchill) and – later in 1940 – Pooh (named after the story book character Winnie the Pooh) at St Margaret's at Cliffe. Both guns were spares taken from the stock of guns of the battleship HMS King George V. One gun used a mounting from HMS Furious, while the other had a mounting from a test range; neither was turret-mounted. Their separate and well-camouflaged cordite and shell magazines were buried under deep layers of earth and connected to the guns by railway lines. Both batteries were camouflaged and protected from aerial attack by anti-aircraft emplacements behind and below St. Margaret's.

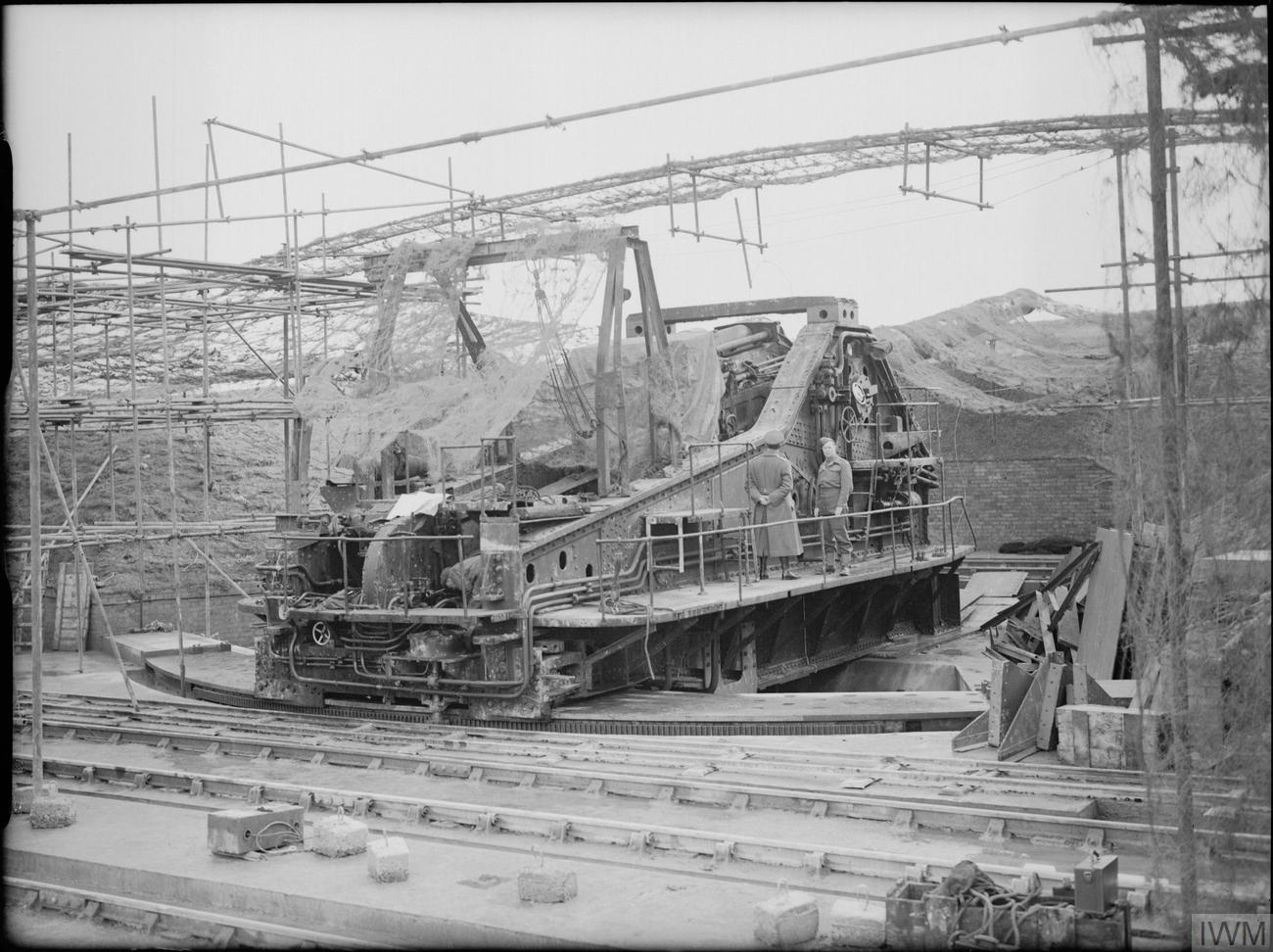
"Pooh" in March 1941

Both guns were operated from separate firing-control rooms and were manned by 25-man troop of the Royal Marines Siege Regiment. Although Winnie fired Britain's first shell onto continental Europe in August 1940 boosting morale, the Mk VII naval guns were slow to reload and ineffectual compared to the German guns in the Pas-de-Calais. Both conducted extreme range counter-battery operations against the Germans' coastal guns but they were too inaccurate and slow to fire on enemy shipping.

Due to these guns' lack of success in targeting shipping, Churchill ordered three new heavy gun batteries to be built in Dover and manned by the Royal Artillery:

- Three BL 6-inch (152 mm) Mk VII guns with a range of 25,000 yd (23,000 m), at Fan Bay Battery
- Four BL 9.2-inch (234 mm) Mks IX–X guns with a range of 31,000 yd (28,000 m) at South Foreland Battery
- Two BL 15-inch (381 mm) Mk I guns with a range of 42,000 yd (38,000 m) at Wanstone Battery, known as Clem (after Clement Attlee) and Jane (after the pin-up).

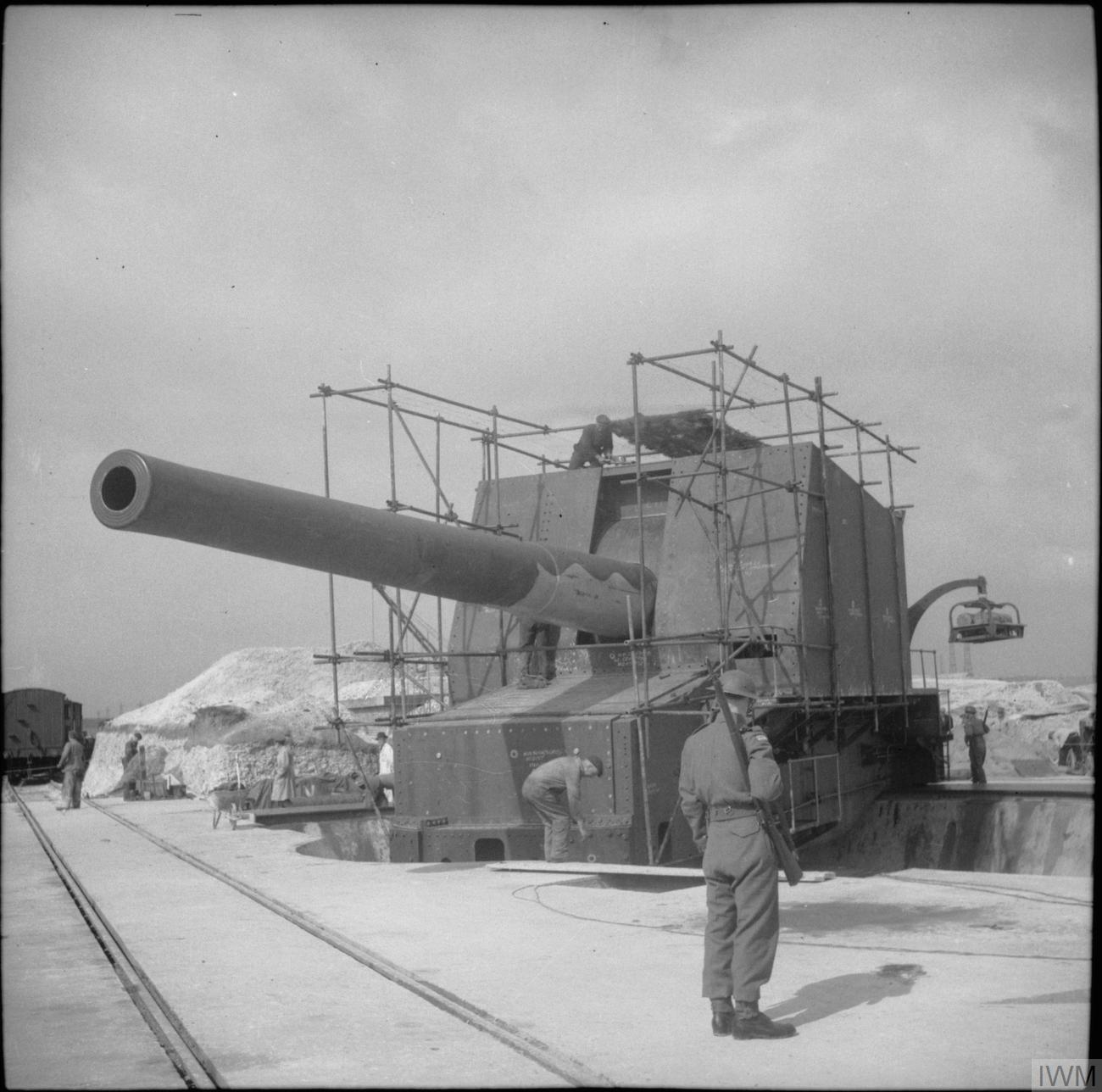
15-inch gun at Wanstone Battery under construction, May 1942

The guns were later joined by Lydden Spout Battery, consisting of three more BL 6-inch Mk VII guns. Also, three BL 13.5-inch (343 mm) Mk V naval guns from the First World War (named Gladiator, Scene Shifter and Piece Maker [sic]) were brought out of retirement in 1939 and mounted on railway chassis.

The British coast batteries sank:

- Pentiver, 2,382 BRT, 2 March 1943
- Livadia 3,094 BRT, 4 October 1943
- Munsterland 6,315 BRT, 20 January 1944
- Recum 5,500 BRT, 20 March 1944
- S.184 sunk 5 September 1944: (Other sources report sunk by own troops)

== Operational history ==
=== Hellfire Corner ===
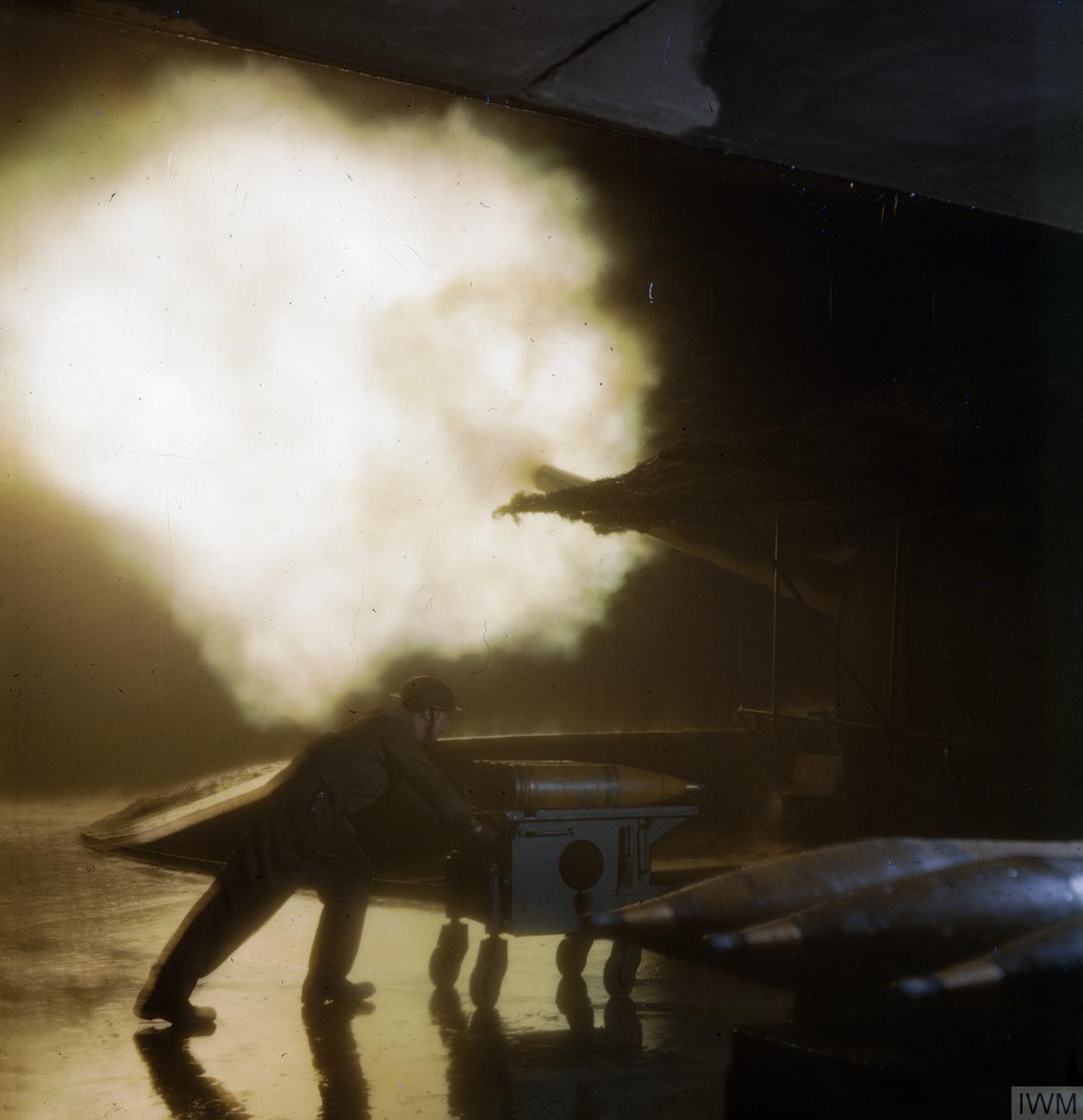
A gunner of 428 Battery, Coast Defence Artillery, pushing a gun trolley loaded with shells, as guns fire at night, December 1942

This gunnery duel, along with heavy German shelling and bombing of Dover Strait and the Dover area, led to this stretch of the Channel being nicknamed Hellfire Corner and led to 3,059 alerts, 216 civilian deaths and damage to 10,056 premises in the Dover area. British coastal convoys had to pass through the bottleneck of the Dover strait to transport supplies, particularly coal; Britain's road and rail network was not then able to cope with the volume of traffic that had to be handled. Although the German guns regularly fired on these slow moving convoys from 1940 to 1944, with an interlude in 1943, they only sank one ship though they damaged several others. Two seamen were killed and others were injured by shell splinters from near misses. However, the civilian crews of the merchant ships found the shelling more unnerving than the attacks by aircraft or E-boats that they were also subjected to and there were instances of crews refusing to sail from their forming-up point at Southend-on-Sea because of the German guns.

=== The Channel Dash ===
On 11 February 1942, the German battleships Scharnhorst and Gneisenau, the heavy cruiser Prinz Eugen and more than twenty smaller escort vessels sailed from Brest in Brittany to their home port of Wilhelmshaven by an audacious dash through the English Channel, codenamed Unternehmen Zerberus (Operation Cerberus). Due to poor visibility and a number of communication failures by British forces, the first response to the German squadron was by the 9.2-inch guns of the South Foreland Battery, which were the only guns which could be directed by radar but the 10-cm S band set had only recently been installed and had never been used in conjunction with the guns. As the visibility was only 5 nmi (5.8 mi; 9.3 km), it was hoped that the radar would be able to register the splashes as the shells landed so that the guns would be able to correct their aim but nothing was detected. After firing three two-gun salvoes without being able to detect the "fall of shot" – the shells were actually landing almost a mile astern of the main German ships – it was decided to fire full salvoes using only the ranging information from the radar. After six minutes of rapid fire, the last shots were fired at a range of 30,000 yd (27,000 m). None of the 33 shells fired came close to the German ships. A minute before the last shots were fired, South Foreland came under counter-battery fire from across the Channel but little damage was sustained.

=== Final duels ===
During the Anglo-Canadian operation to capture Calais, on 26 September 1944 (the last day of shelling) fifty shells were fired, killing five people, the last of whom was 63-year-old Patience Ransley, who was killed by a shell from the Lindemann Battery while sheltering in the 900 ft (270 m) long "Barwick's Cave" reinforced cliff tunnel. Accurate bombardment from the British heavy guns at Dover disabled the Grosser Kurfürst Battery at Floringzelle near Cap Gris Nez, ending the duels. Dover was finally freed from bombardment and to mark the event the town's mayor was sent a German flag from the batteries.

== Legacy ==
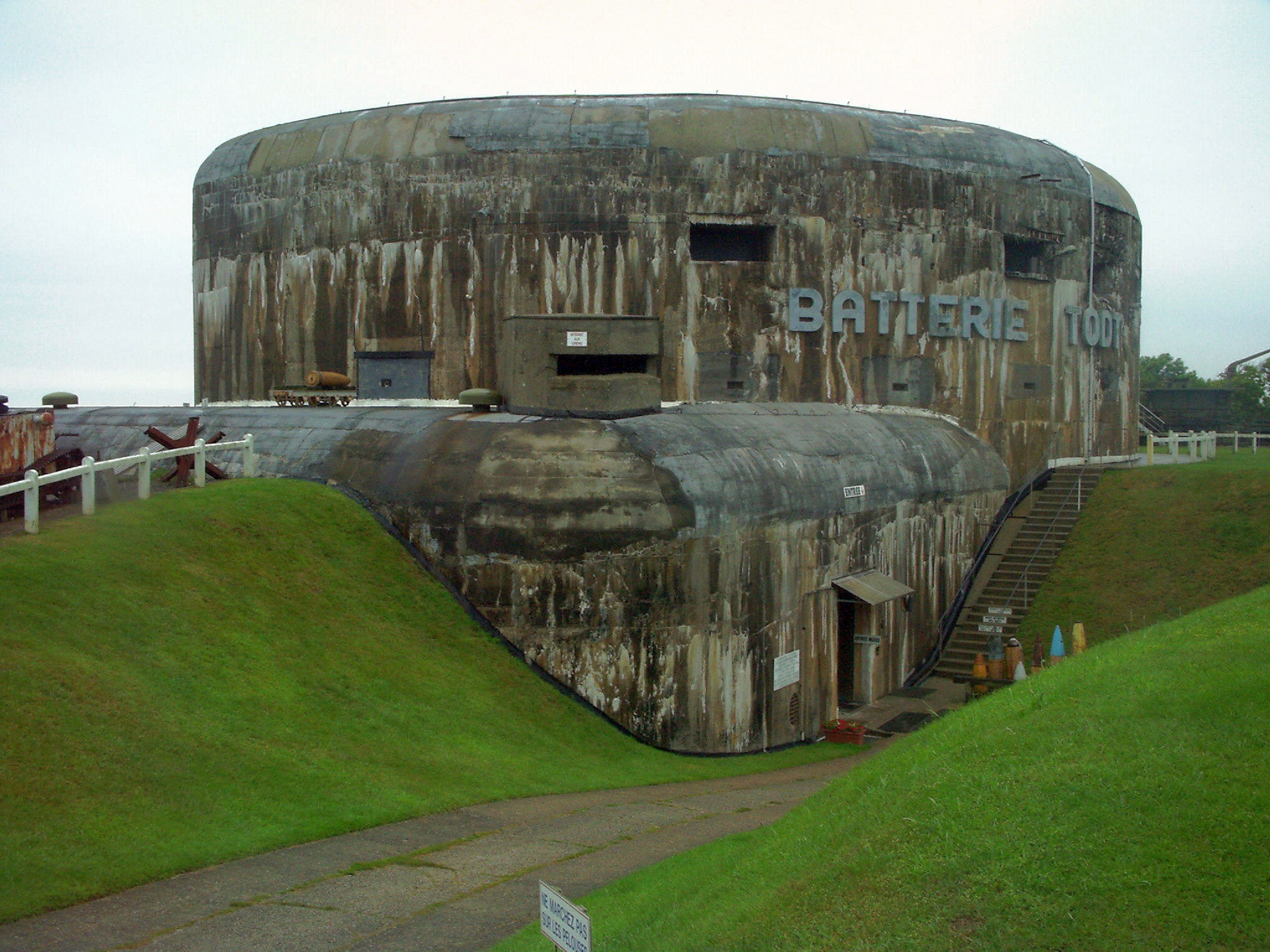
Preserved remains of the Batterie Todt c. 2004

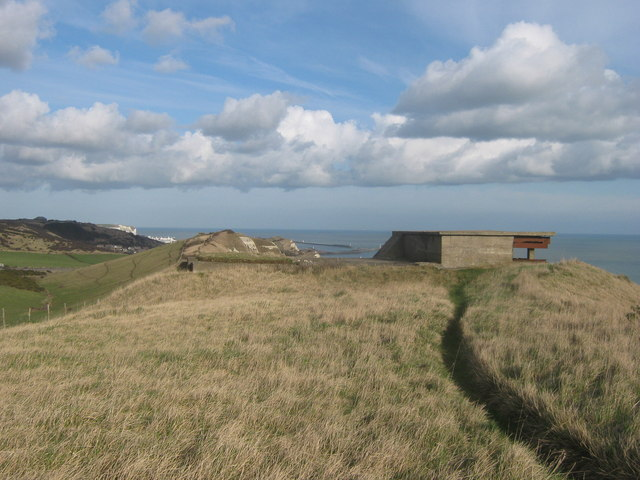
The now-derelict Observation Post at Hougham Battery was constructed in 1941 for three 8 inch Mk VIII naval guns.

Between Calais and Boulogne-sur-Mer considerable parts of the concrete gun emplacements and associated bunkers remain accessible, although often in somewhat dangerous conditions. One of the casemates of the Todt Battery can be visited at the Musée du Mur de l'Atlantique, the Atlantic Wall Museum, at Audinghen. One of the Krupp K5 guns is also there. Since 1954, a section of painted armour plating taken as a war trophy from a turret of the Lindemann Battery has been on display on the Dover seafront. Many of the British batteries remained until the decision was taken to retire all the coastal artillery in 1956. The 15-inch guns at Wanstone Farm were not removed until 1959. The sites have either been demolished, buried or left to decay. At Wanstone Farm Battery, ancillary buildings such as the plotting room and the guard house are visible, although overgrown and the sergeants' mess has reverted to its original use as a farm house.

== See also ==
- V-3 cannon German supergun of 1943–44 at Mimoyecques, Pas-de-Calais
- Dover Castle
- Hougham Battery
- List of naval guns
- Operation Sea Lion
- Fan Bay Deep Shelter
