= Lydden Spout Battery =

Artillery battery near Dover, England

Coordinates: 51°06′14″N 1°15′36″E

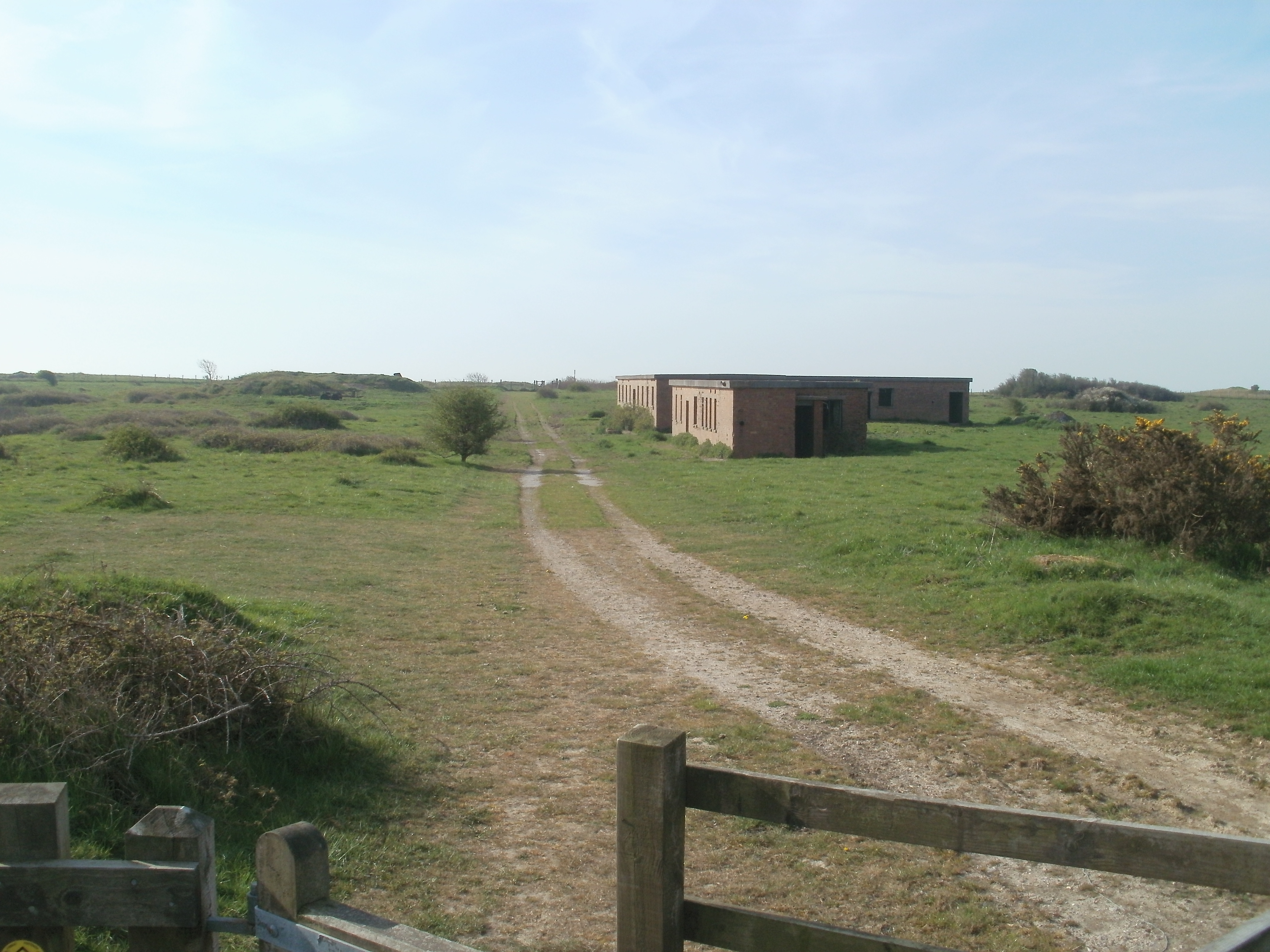
Lydden Spout Battery in 2010, showing the Warrant Officer's Mess, Sergeants Mess, dining room and cook house.

Lydden Spout Battery is a World War II coastal defence battery built in 1941 west of Dover. Originally armed with three 6-inch Mark VII naval guns on Mark V mountings, later upgraded to Mark XXIV guns on the same mountings. Fan Bay Battery to the east of Dover is built to the same plan.

The battery is to the south of the current A20. Most of the buildings have been demolished and the emplacements filled with concrete, but the catering rooms survive.

Lydden Spout Battery's remaining buildings above ground: Warrant Officer's Mess/Sergeants Mess in the foreground. Dining room and cook house is the L-shaped building behind.

== See also ==
- Cross-Channel guns in the Second World War
