= Dungeness =

Headland in Kent

Coordinates: 50°55′00″N 0°58′00″E

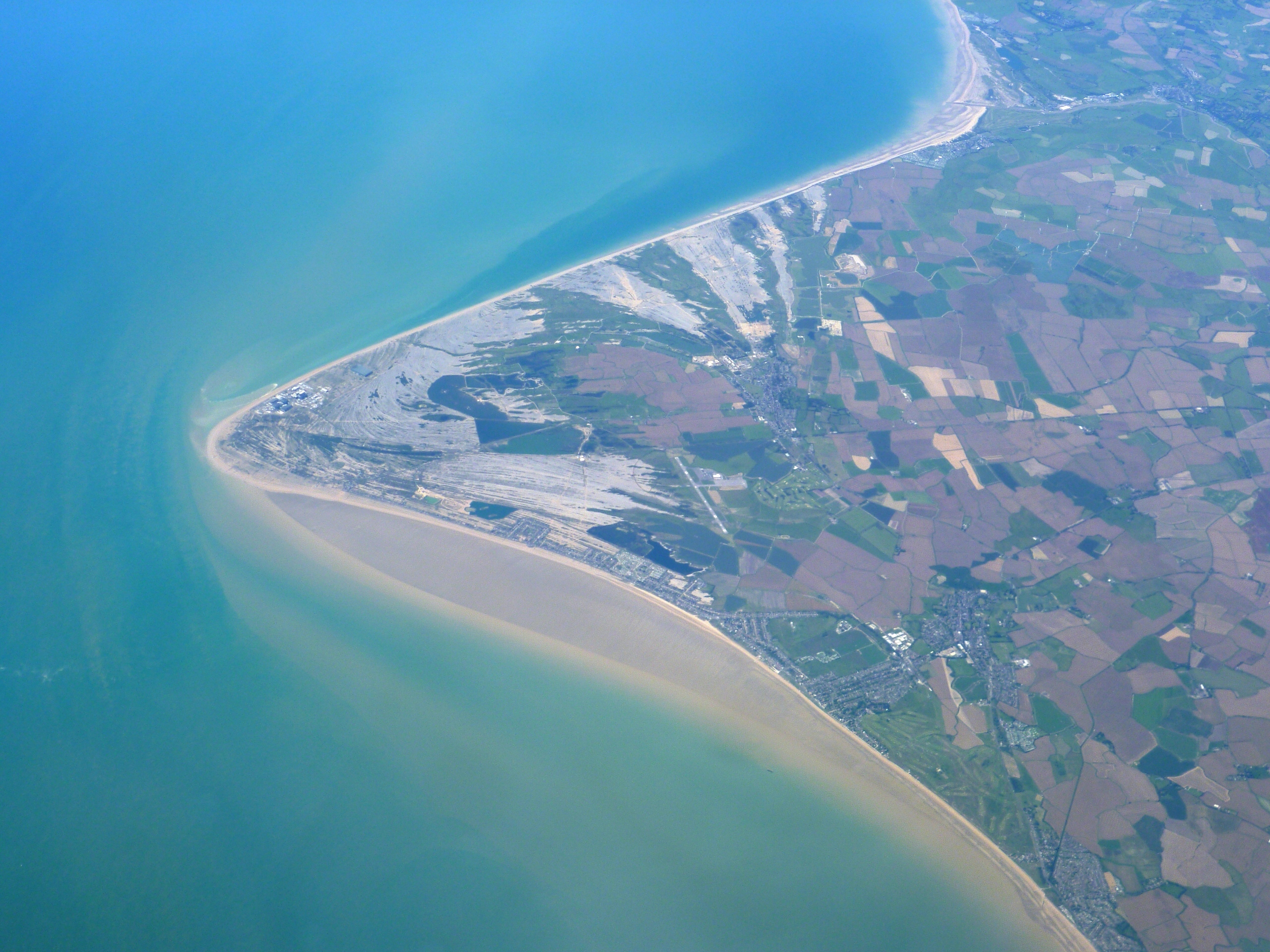
- Aerial view of Dungeness

- Location within Kent
- Area: 12 sq mi (31 km^{2})
- OS grid reference: TR0917
- Civil parish: Lydd
- District: Folkestone and Hythe
- Shire county: Kent
- Region: South East
- Country: England
- Sovereign state: United Kingdom
- Post town: Romney Marsh
- Postcode district: TN29
- Dialling code: 01797
- Police: Kent
- Fire: Kent
- Ambulance: South East Coast
- UK Parliament: Folkestone and Hythe
- Website: www.dungeness.org.uk

Dungeness (UK: /ˌdʌndʒəˈnɛs/, UK: /ˌdʌndʒˈnɛs/) is a headland on the coast of Kent, England, formed largely of a shingle beach in the form of a cuspate foreland. It shelters a large area of low-lying land, Romney Marsh. Dungeness spans Dungeness Nuclear Power Station, the hamlet of Dungeness, and an ecological site at the same location. It lies within the civil parish of Lydd.

== Etymology ==
Dungeness's name means "the headland at Denge", referring to nearby Denge Marsh. The marsh is first mentioned in 774 as Dengemersc. Its name may mean "marsh of the pasture district", from Old English denn *gē mersc, or else "marsh with manured land", from Old English dyncge mersc.

== Nature ==
=== Ecology ===
Dungeness is one of the largest expanses of shingle in Europe. It is of international conservation importance for its geomorphology, plant and invertebrate communities and bird life. This is recognised and protected mostly through its conservation designations as a national nature reserve (NNR), a Special Protection Area (SPA), a Special Area of Conservation (SAC) and part of the Site of Special Scientific Interest (SSSI) of Dungeness, Romney Marsh and Rye Bay.

There is a variety of wildlife living at Dungeness, with over 600 different types of plants: a third of all those found in Britain. There are invertebrates such as moths, bees, beetles, and spiders; many of these of a rare or native type to Dungeness.

The flooded gravel pits on Denge Beach, both brackish and fresh water, provide an important refuge for many migratory and coastal bird species. The RSPB has a bird reserve there, and every year thousands of bird watchers visit the peninsula and its bird observatory.

One of the most remarkable features of the site is an area known as "the patch" or, by anglers, as "the boil". The waste hot water from the Dungeness nuclear power stations is pumped into the sea through two outfall pipes, enriching the biological productivity of the sea bed and attracting seabirds from miles around.

Beach fishing is popular at Dungeness, with the area being a nationally recognised cod fishing venue in the winter. Other fish such as common dab and merlangius (Whiting) may be caught in the winter as well. It is a popular mark for European sea bass In the summer too.

It has been reported that Dungeness had such low rainfall as to qualify as the only desert in the UK. However, a spokesperson for the Met Office refuted this in 2015.

=== Climate ===
The climate in Dungeness is mild and generally warm and temperate. There is significant rainfall throughout the year. The average annual temperature is 11.1 °C (52.0 °F). Precipitation averages 715 millimetres (28.1 in) annually. The Köppen Climate Classification subtype for this climate is "Cfb" (Marine West Coast Climate/Oceanic climate).

Climate data for Dungeness weather station, 3m amsl (WMO identifier: 03888) 1991−2020 normals
Month	Jan	Feb	Mar	Apr	May	Jun	Jul	Aug	Sep	Oct	Nov	Dec	Year
Record high °C (°F)	13.2 (55.8)	12.6 (54.7)	15.7 (60.3)	18.3 (64.9)	23.2 (73.8)	25.6 (78.1)	28.9 (84.0)	26.2 (79.2)	25.0 (77.0)	22.2 (72.0)	16.5 (61.7)	13.5 (56.3)	28.9 (84.0)
Mean daily maximum °C (°F)	8.2 (46.8)	8.3 (46.9)	10.0 (50.0)	12.5 (54.5)	15.0 (59.0)	17.8 (64.0)	19.9 (67.8)	20.3 (68.5)	18.9 (66.0)	15.6 (60.1)	11.6 (52.9)	8.8 (47.8)	13.9 (57.0)
Daily mean °C (°F)	5.7 (42.3)	5.7 (42.3)	7.2 (45.0)	9.4 (48.9)	12.0 (53.6)	14.8 (58.6)	17.0 (62.6)	17.3 (63.1)	15.7 (60.3)	12.7 (54.9)	9.0 (48.2)	6.3 (43.3)	11.1 (52.0)
Mean daily minimum °C (°F)	3.3 (37.9)	3.2 (37.8)	4.5 (40.1)	6.3 (43.3)	9.0 (48.2)	11.7 (53.1)	14.0 (57.2)	14.4 (57.9)	12.5 (54.5)	9.8 (49.6)	6.4 (43.5)	3.8 (38.8)	8.3 (46.9)
Record low °C (°F)	−10.7 (12.7)	−9.0 (15.8)	−8.7 (16.3)	−3.0 (26.6)	−1.2 (29.8)	0.0 (32.0)	5.4 (41.7)	5.2 (41.4)	1.7 (35.1)	0.0 (32.0)	−6.4 (20.5)	−8.5 (16.7)	−10.7 (12.7)
Average precipitation mm (inches)	71.6 (2.82)	48.9 (1.93)	41.9 (1.65)	51.9 (2.04)	44.5 (1.75)	46.1 (1.81)	47.3 (1.86)	56.6 (2.23)	62.5 (2.46)	80.1 (3.15)	88.7 (3.49)	75.0 (2.95)	715.0 (28.15)
Average precipitation days (≥ 1.0 mm)	10.9	9.3	9.8	8.5	8.1	8.7	7.2	7.9	8.8	12.2	12.1	11.1	114.6
Source 1: Met Office (precipitation days 1981-2010)
Source 2: Starlings Roost Weather

== Buildings ==
=== Lighthouses ===
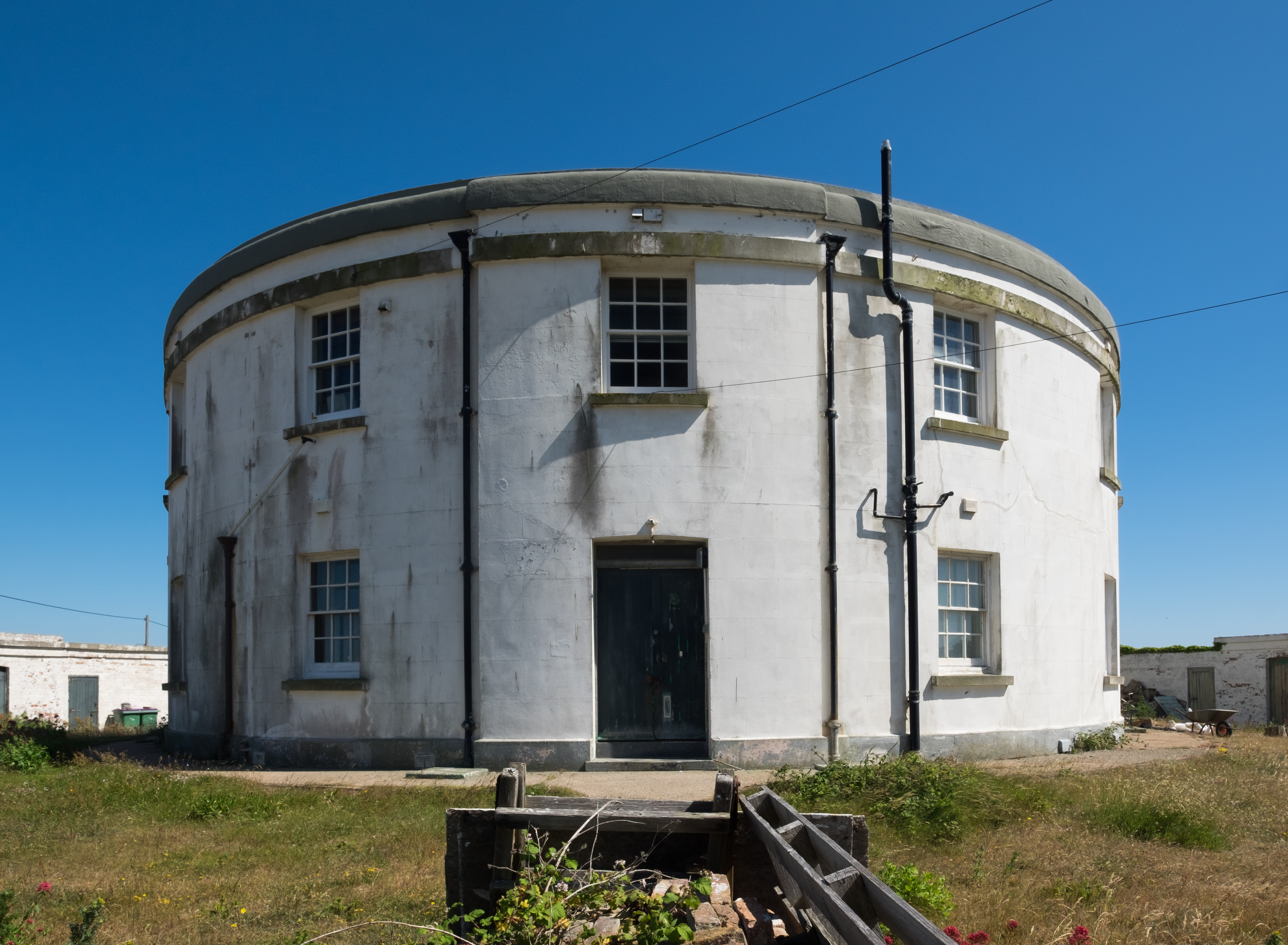
Lighthousemen's Dwellings made from the first two storeys of the 1792 lighthouse after the 1904 lighthouse replaced it

There have been seven lighthouses at Dungeness, five high and two low, with the fifth high one still fully operational today. At first, only a beacon was used to warn sailors, but this was replaced by a wooden lighthouse in 1615 which was 11 m (35 ft) tall. As the sea retreated, this had to be replaced in 1635 by a new lighthouse nearer to the water's edge known as Lamplough's Tower which was around 34 m (110 ft) high.

As more shingle was thrown up, a new and more up-to-date lighthouse was built near the sea in 1792 by Samuel Wyatt. This lighthouse was 35 m (116 ft) high and of the same design as the third Eddystone Lighthouse. From the mid-19th century, it was painted black with a white band to make it more visible in daylight; similar colours have featured on the subsequent lighthouses here. This lighthouse was demolished in 1904, but the lighthouse keepers' accommodation, built in a circle around the base of the tower, still exists.

In 1901, the building of the fourth lighthouse, the High Light Tower, started. It was first lit on 31 March 1904 and still stands today. It is no longer in use as a lighthouse but is open as a visitor attraction. It is a circular brick structure, 46 m (150 ft) high and 11 m (36 ft) in diameter at ground level. It has 169 steps and gives visitors a good view of the shingle beach.

As the sea receded further, and after building the nuclear power station which obscured the light of the 1904 lighthouse, a fifth lighthouse, Dungeness Lighthouse was built.

=== Power stations ===
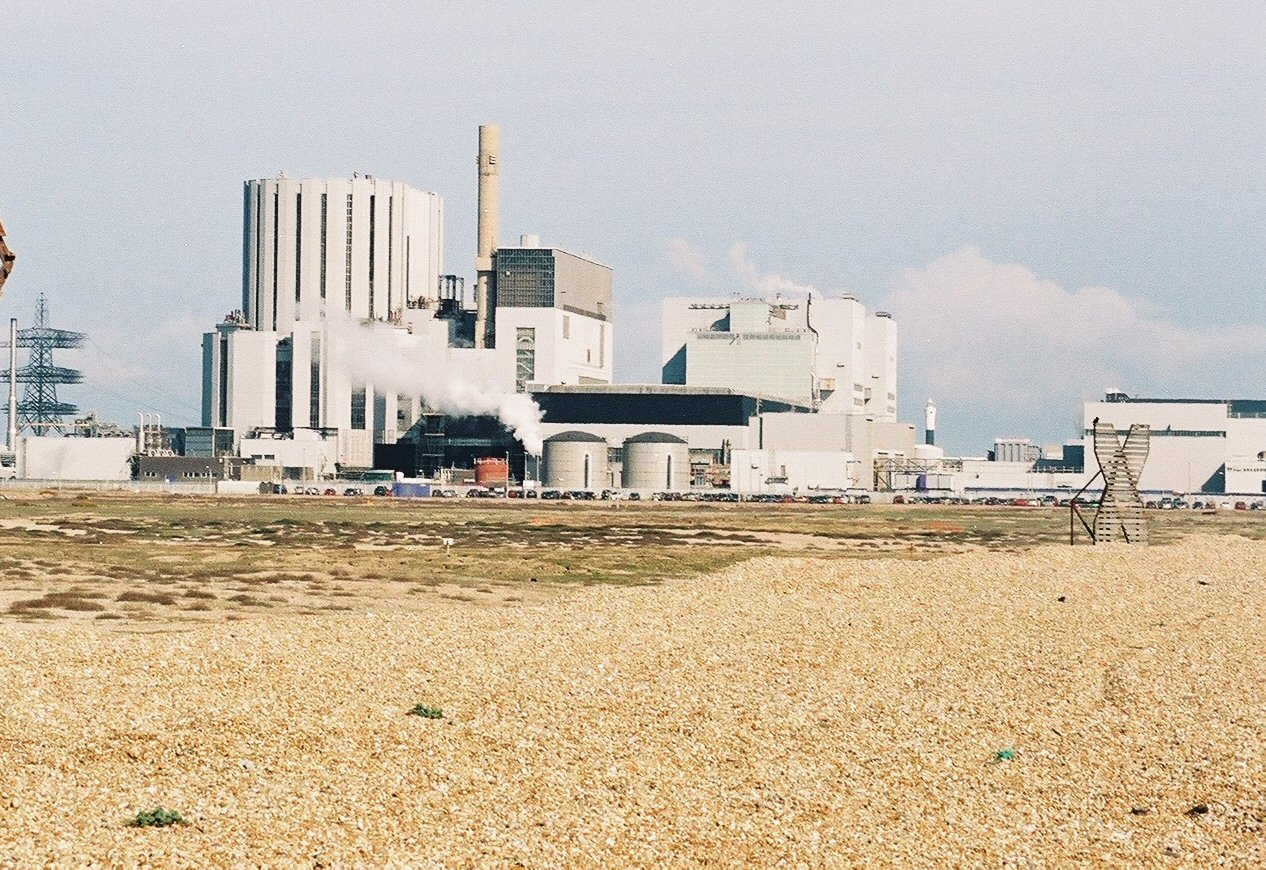
Dungeness B.

There are two nuclear power stations at Dungeness, identified as "A" and "B", the first built in 1965 and the second in 1983. They are within a wildlife sanctuary designated a Site of Special Scientific Interest, and birds flourish in the warmer water created by the station's outflow.

The older power station closed on 31 December 2006, while the current owner EDF Energy announced in June 2021 that the newer station would not resume operations, which had halted in September 2018, and would move into the defuelling phase with immediate effect.

There is no longer a public visitor centre, and tours of the station are unavailable.

=== The hamlet ===
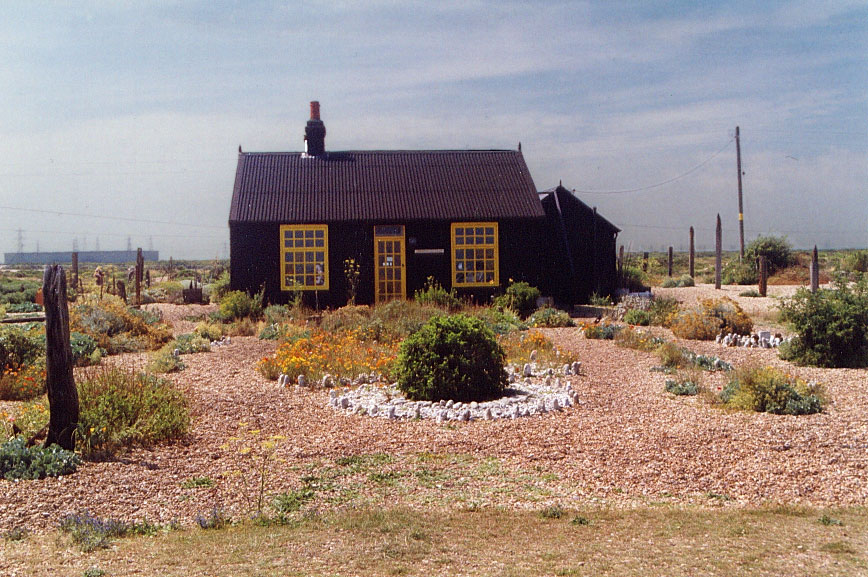
Prospect Cottage, Dungeness in 2004

In addition to the power station and lighthouse, there is a collection of dwellings. Most are wooden weatherboard beach houses, but there are also around 30 houses converted from old railway coaches in the 1920s. These houses are owned and occupied by fishermen whose boats lie on the beach. Closer to the main road, there is a large building – comprising five conjoined homes – previously tenanted by coastguards. There are more houses around the site of the power stations. There are two public houses: the Britannia and the Pilot, the latter being served by the Pilot Inn railway station from 1928 to 1977. Fresh seafood can be purchased from several outlets across the shingle.

A notable house is Prospect Cottage, formerly owned by the late artist and film director Derek Jarman. The cottage is painted black, with a poem, part of John Donne's "The Sunne Rising", written on one side in black lettering. The garden, reflecting the bleak, windswept landscape of the peninsula, is made of pebbles, driftwood, scrap metal and a few hardy plants.

== Transport ==
Dungeness is accessible by two roads, one along the coast from New Romney to the north, and another from Lydd to the north-west. Both roads converge near the Pilot public house, from where a single road runs a mile (1.6 km) south to the tip of Dungeness.

Dungeness is also served by the Romney, Hythe and Dymchurch Railway, a 15 in (381 mm) gauge light railway that covers the 13.5-mile (21.7 km) distance from Hythe. The line, which had opened to New Romney in 1927, was extended to Dungeness station a year later. It still provides a service for tourists.

Dungeness also used to be served by a branch of the Southern Railway from Lydd, terminating near the R.H.&D.R. station, but this was closed following the 1963 Beeching Cuts.

The peninsula has a second, standard gauge railway, but this is now truncated adjacent to the Dungeness Road and only used to carry waste from the power stations. It formerly linked Dungeness (and, via a separate branch, New Romney) to a junction with the Marshlink Line at Appledore. The Dungeness section was closed to passengers on 4 July 1937 and it was truncated on 6 March 1967.

Lydd Airport, sometimes known as London Ashford Airport, lies just to the north-west of Dungeness. Despite opposition, largely due to its proximity to the unique landscape of Dungeness, the airport received permission in 2014 to extend its runway to allow it to handle fully loaded aircraft up to the size of a Boeing 737 or Airbus A319.

== Defence uses ==
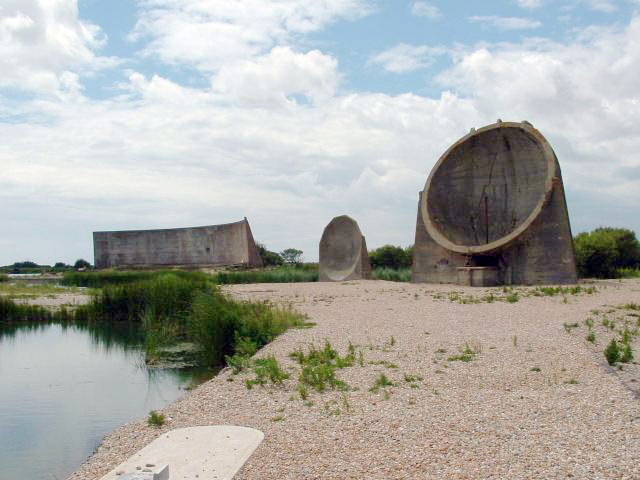
Acoustic mirrors at RAF Denge

The beach and marshes have been used for military training and include marked "danger areas". In World War I Lydd Camp was here.

Denge, a former Royal Air Force site at the northern edge of the Dungeness headland, is the site of a set of acoustic mirrors, known as the "Listening Ears". Built between 1928 and 1930, the three massive concrete structures formed an experimental early warning system that aimed to detect invading aircraft by focusing sound waves. The site was chosen as being one of the quietest in Britain. Their different forms are evidence of their experimental nature; they were not particularly effective and were abandoned when radar became available. The site is now managed by the Royal Society for the Protection of Birds.

In 1944, some of the world's first underwater oil pipelines were laid between Dungeness and France in Operation Pluto. The lines from Dungeness were part of a network called "Dumbo" and ran to Ambleteuse in France.

== Dungeness Tudor ship ==
In 2022 the well-preserved remains of a 16th-century ship were found in Denge quarry at Dungeness.

== Media appearances ==
Dungeness appears quite often in music videos, album covers and adverts. It featured on the cover of Pink Floyd's 1981 album A Collection of Great Dance Songs. British band The Soup Dragons shot the videos for their top 5 1990 hit '"I'm Free", and follow-up top 20 1991 hit "Mother Universe" on Dungeness; and there have also been several photo shoots by the band in the area.

The shingle beach and fishermen's shacks feature extensively in the Lighthouse Family promotional video for their 1998 song "High". The acoustic mirror at Dungeness is featured on the cover of the album Ether Song by the British indie band Turin Brakes. Dungeness appears on the covers of albums as diverse as So Much for the City by The Thrills and Aled by Aled Jones. The Prodigy's single "Invaders Must Die" video was filmed here and shows both the acoustic mirrors and the lighthouse. In 2011, the music video for the song Walk the River by British band Guillemots was filmed on the headland. In 2012, Nicki Minaj's single Freedom was filmed on the beach and with the acoustic mirrors. The music video for Lithuanian DJ Ten Walls' hit single Walking With Elephants was shot on the headland and in the surrounding sea and featured many of the areas prominent landmarks. In 2016, The Wholls also filmed the music video for their single "X21". In 2020, the music video for Nothing But Thieves's single Impossible was partly filmed on the beach. Also, Dungeness contains a fisherman's hut owned by Ed Sheeran, who used the headland as the stimulus for his sing "England".

Athlete have a song on the album Vehicles and Animals called "Dungeness" which is about the area. Get Cape. Wear Cape. Fly mentions Dungeness and the lighthouse in his song "Lighthouse Keeper". The Kent-based hardcore punk band November Coming Fire released a 2006 album entitled Dungeness, featuring a track called "Powerstation" which included a recording of waves on the beach, and Scottish folk band Trembling Bells named their album Dungeness too.

In television, the Dungeness landscape, the lighthouse and the power station have been used on digital channel E4 at the beginning and end of advertising breaks. It was used as a backdrop for the ITV drama The Poison Tree. The area featured in an episode of the BBC detective serial The Inspector Lynley Mysteries and in March 2007 was the setting for a major part of an EastEnders special. Famously in January 1971 the BBC filmed the 4-part Doctor Who serial The Claws of Axos in Dungeness. Starring Jon Pertwee as the Third Doctor, the story featured an alien space craft burying itself in the shingle of Dungeness beach. The 1981 fantasy film Time Bandits shot its "Time of Legends" sequence on the beach, and Dungeness was used to film a scene in Danny Boyle's Trance.

The lighthouse and railway station can be seen in the 1951 film The Dark Man. Much of the Michael Winterbottom's 1998 film I Want You was set in and around Dungeness: the lead character's home was one of the wooden beach huts. The Derek Jarman avant-garde 1990 film The Garden was set and filmed in Dungeness.

== See also ==
- Battle of Dungeness, a 1652 battle of the First Anglo-Dutch War
- Dungeness, Washington – named after Dungeness
- Dungeness crab – named after Dungeness, Washington
- Punta Dúngeness in the Strait of Magellan – named after Dungeness
