= Magħtab =

Village and landfill

Coordinates: 35.945°N 14.44°E

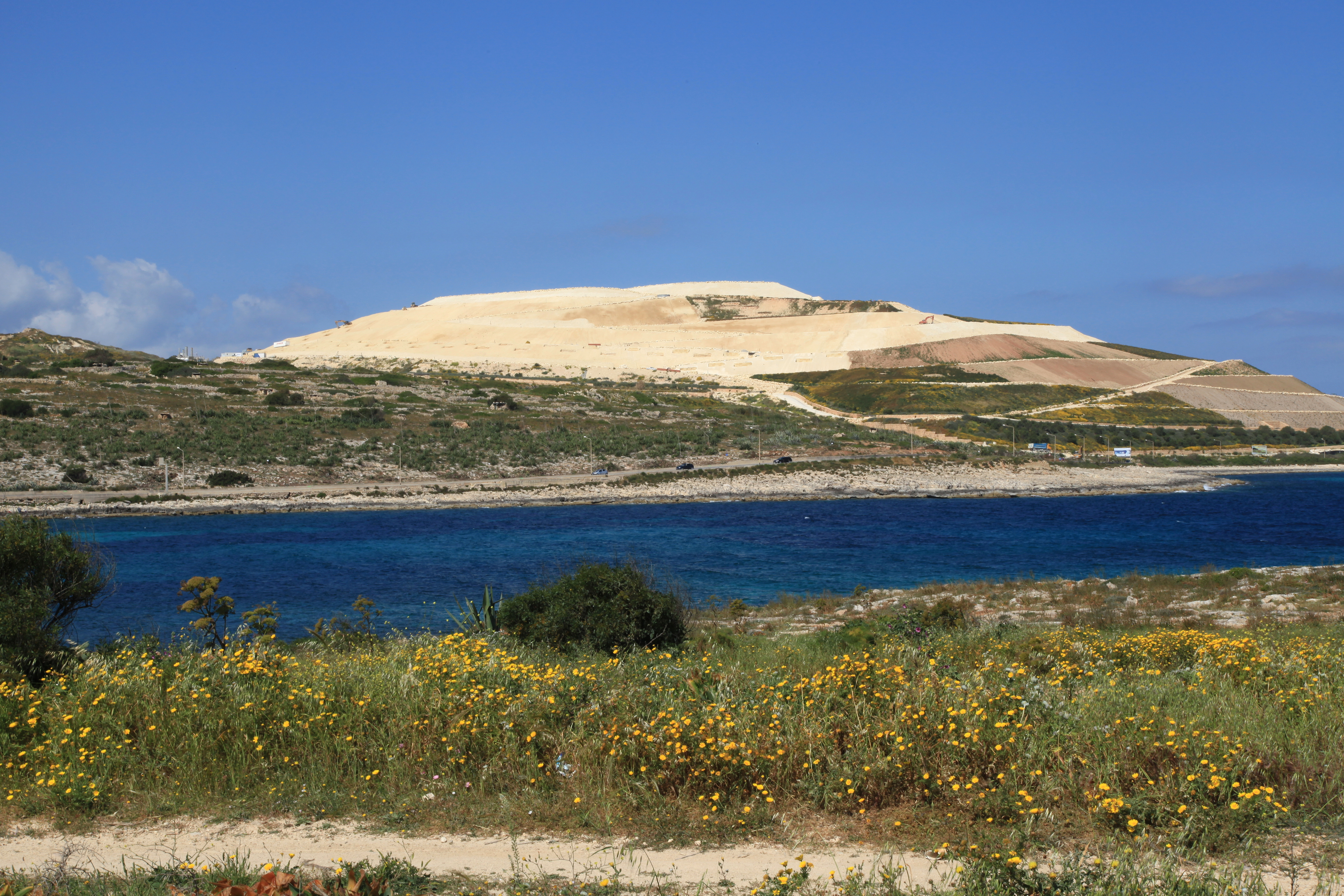
The landfill, commonly known as 'Mount Magħtab'

Magħtab is a Maltese village. It lies in the valley of the same name in the local council of Naxxar. It is the site of the largest landfill in the island, commonly known as 'Mount Magħtab'. The landfill was closed when Malta joined the EU in 2004, but two others were subsequently opened.

The Il-Widna acoustic mirror is located 1,410 metres (1,540 yd) away. The hill of Ġebel San Pietru also lies within the confines of Magħtab.

In December 2021, residents noticed new excavated rock and construction waste, forming a new 'waste mountain'.

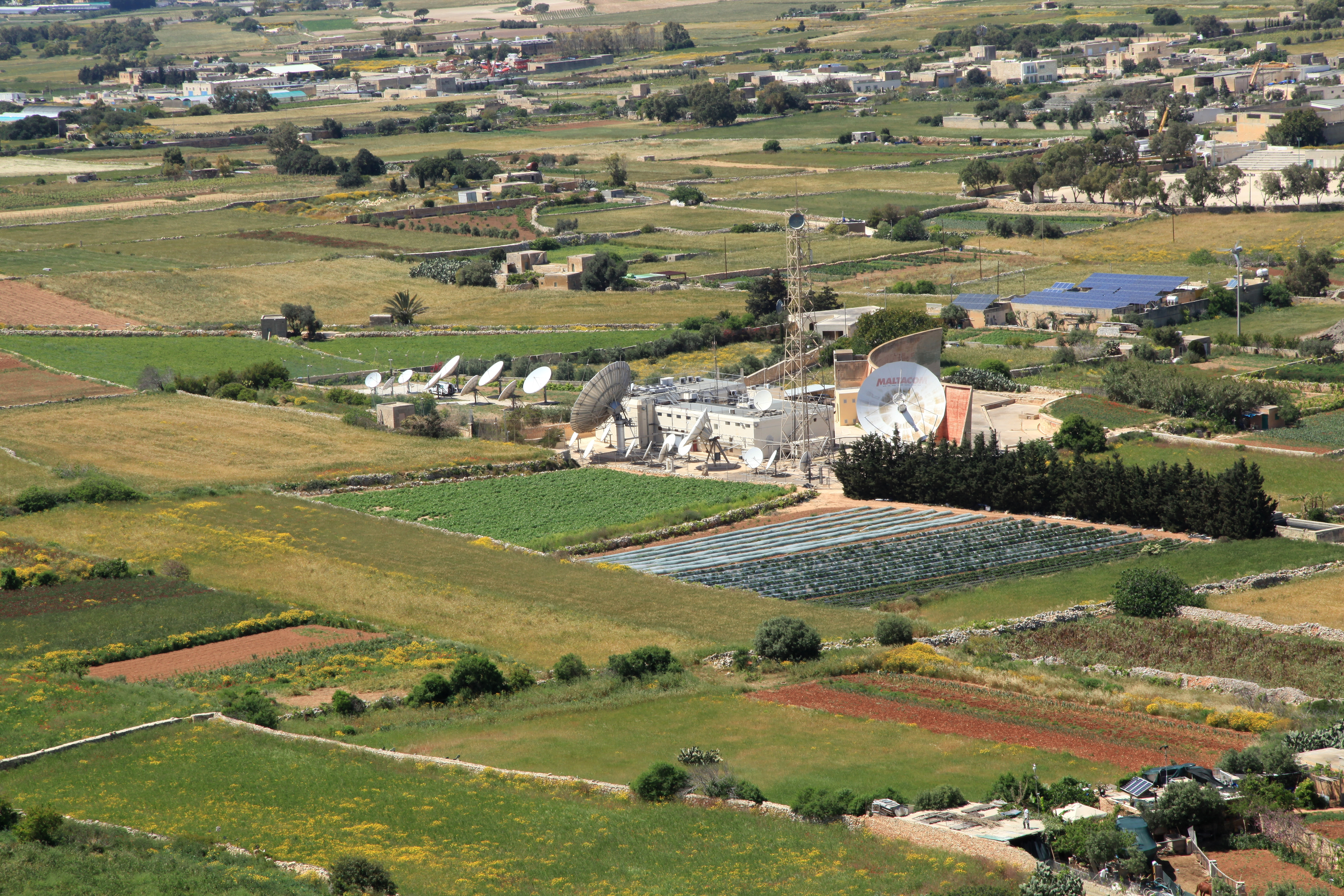
The 'Ear' or acoustic mirror (centre)

On June 1, 2026, a fireworks factory near the village exploded, injuring two farmers and reportedly rattling buildings across Malta.
