= Fan Bay Deep Shelter =

Military tunnels in Dover, England

Coordinates: 51°08′10.8″N 1°21′37.55″E

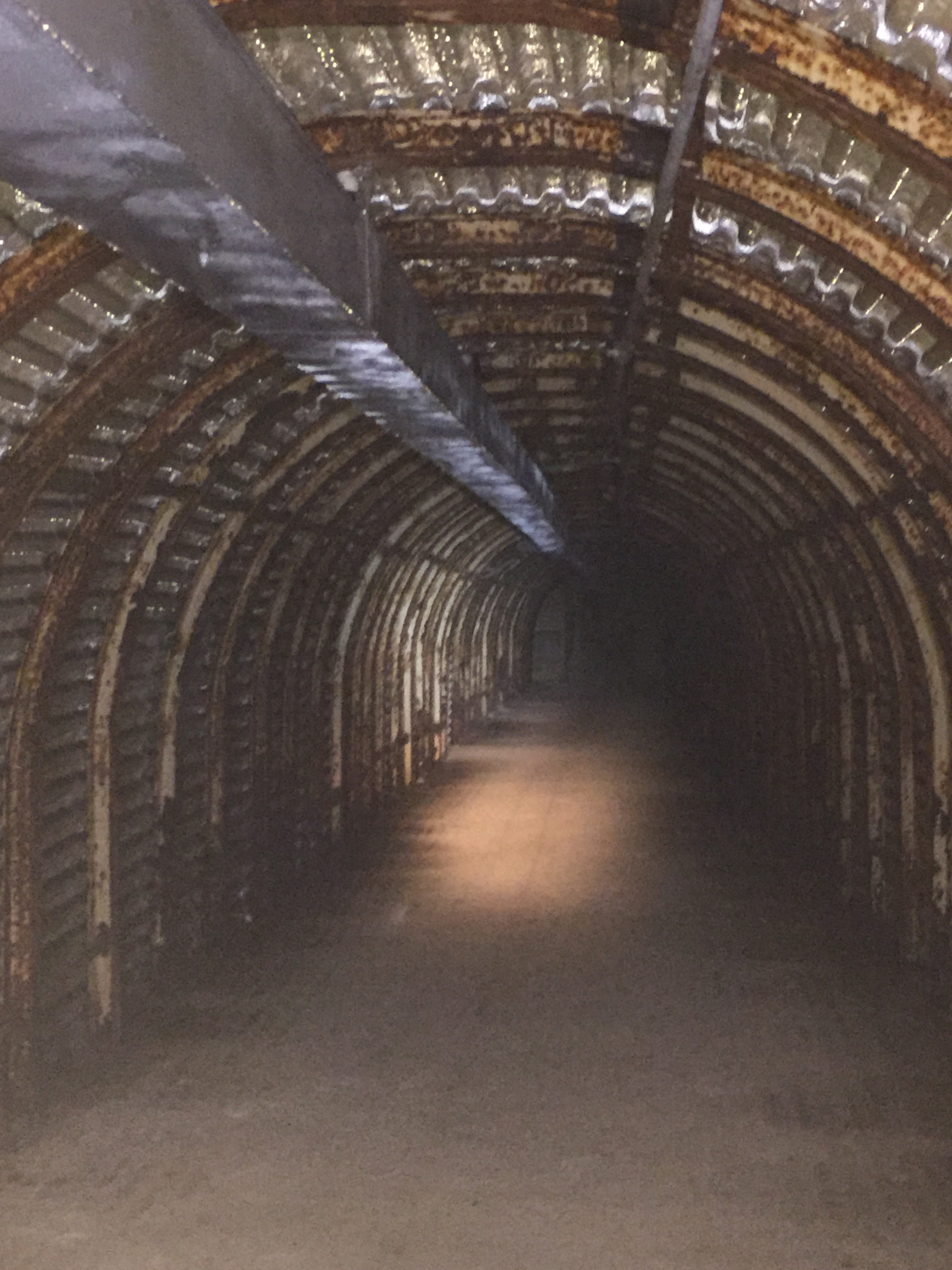
Internal structure of the Fan Bay Deep Shelter.

Fan Bay Deep Shelter is a series of tunnels constructed during World War II as accommodation for Fan Bay Battery artillery battery, 23 metres down in the White Cliffs of Dover at Fan Bay near the Port of Dover. The tunnels and gun battery were built by the Royal Engineers between 20 November 1940 and 28 February 1941. The site is maintained by the National Trust.

The tunnels are lined with corrugated steel arching and the complex originally included five large tunnels with storage space for bunk beds, rifles, a hospital and a secure store, a generator, toilets and washrooms. The gun battery was intended to attack enemy shipping moving through the English Channel.

The tunnels were abandoned in the 1950s and filled in with debris in the 1970s. In 2012 the tunnels were rediscovered by the National Trust after purchasing this section of the cliffs. The restoration work, carried out mainly by volunteers over 18 months, included removal of 100 tonnes of rubble. The tunnels were opened to the public on 20 July 2015.

Near the site are two World War I sound mirrors.

== See also ==
- Cross-Channel guns in the Second World War
