= Acoustic mirror =

Passive sound reflection device

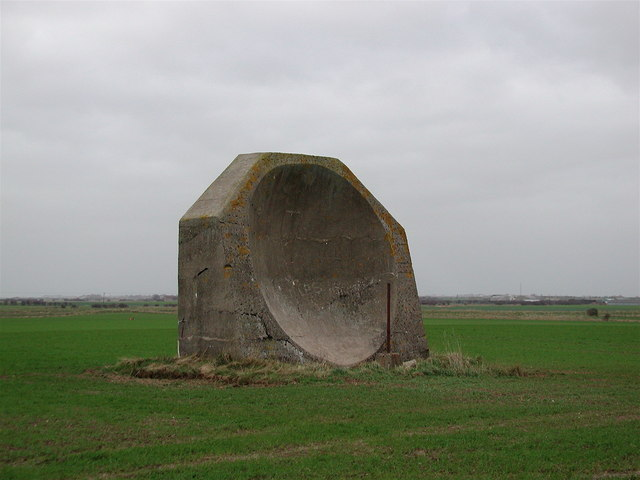
4.5-metre-high (14 ft 9 in) WW1 concrete acoustic mirror near Kilnsea Grange, East Yorkshire, UK. The pipe which held the "collector head" (microphone) can be seen in front of the structure.

An acoustic mirror is a passive device used to reflect and focus (concentrate) sound waves. Parabolic acoustic mirrors are widely used in parabolic microphones to pick up sound from great distances, employed in surveillance and reporting of outdoor sporting events. Pairs of large parabolic acoustic mirrors which function as "whisper galleries" are displayed in science museums to demonstrate sound focusing.

Between the World Wars, before the invention of radar, parabolic sound mirrors were used experimentally as early-warning devices by military air defence forces to detect incoming enemy aircraft by listening for the sound of their engines.

During World War II on the coast of southern England, a network of large concrete acoustic mirrors was in the process of being built when the project was cancelled owing to the development of the Chain Home radar system. Some of these mirrors are still standing today.

== Acoustic aircraft detection ==
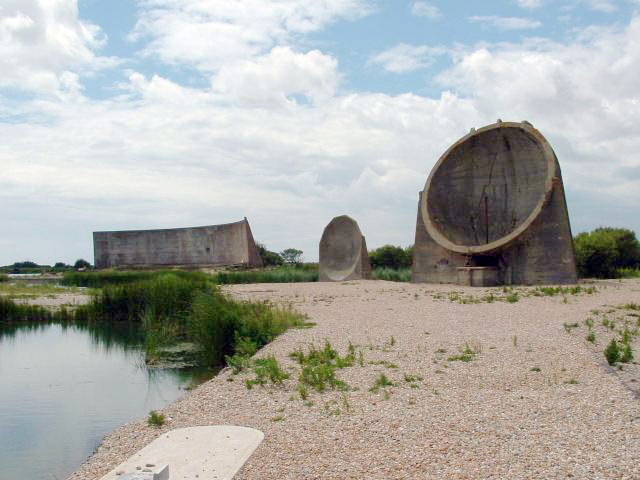
Acoustic mirrors at RAF Denge

Before World War II and the invention of radar, acoustic mirrors were built as early warning devices around the coasts of Great Britain, with the aim of detecting incoming enemy aircraft by the sound of their engines. The most famous of these devices still stand at Denge on the Dungeness peninsula and at Hythe in Kent. Other examples exist in other parts of Britain (including Sunderland, Redcar, Boulby, Kilnsea and Selsey Bill), and Baħar iċ-Ċagħaq in Malta. The Maltese sound mirror is known locally as "the ear" (il-Widna).

The Dungeness mirrors, known colloquially as the "listening ears", consist of three large concrete reflectors built in the 1920s–1930s. Their experimental nature can be discerned by the different shapes of each of the three reflectors: one is a long curved wall about 5 m (16 ft) high by 70 m (230 ft) long, while the other two are dish-shaped constructions approximately 4–5 m (13–16 ft) in diameter. Microphones placed at the foci of the reflectors enabled a listener to detect the sound of aircraft far out over the English Channel. The reflectors are not parabolic, but are actually spherical mirrors. Spherical mirrors can be used for direction finding by moving the sensor rather than the mirror; another unusual example was the Arecibo Observatory.

Acoustic mirrors had a limited effectiveness, and the increasing speed of aircraft in the 1930s meant that they would already be too close to engage by the time they had been detected. The development of radar put an end to further experimentation with the technique. Nevertheless, there were long-lasting benefits. The acoustic mirror programme, led by Dr William Sansome Tucker, had given Britain the methodology to use interconnected stations to pinpoint the position of an enemy in the sky.

The system they developed for linking the stations and plotting aircraft movements was given to the early radar team and contributed to their success in World War II.

== Modern uses ==
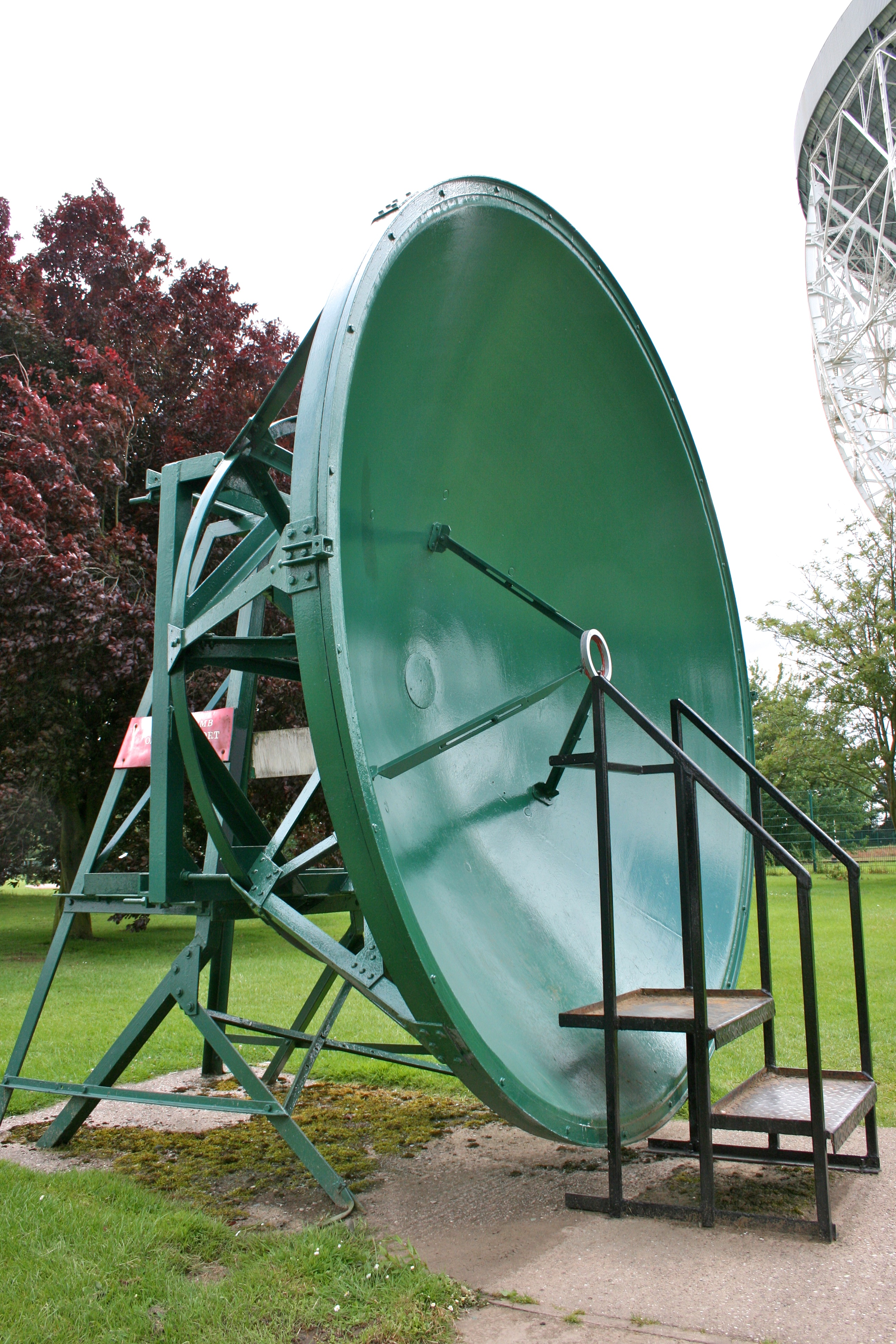
A parabolic whispering dish that is part of an installation at Jodrell Bank Observatory

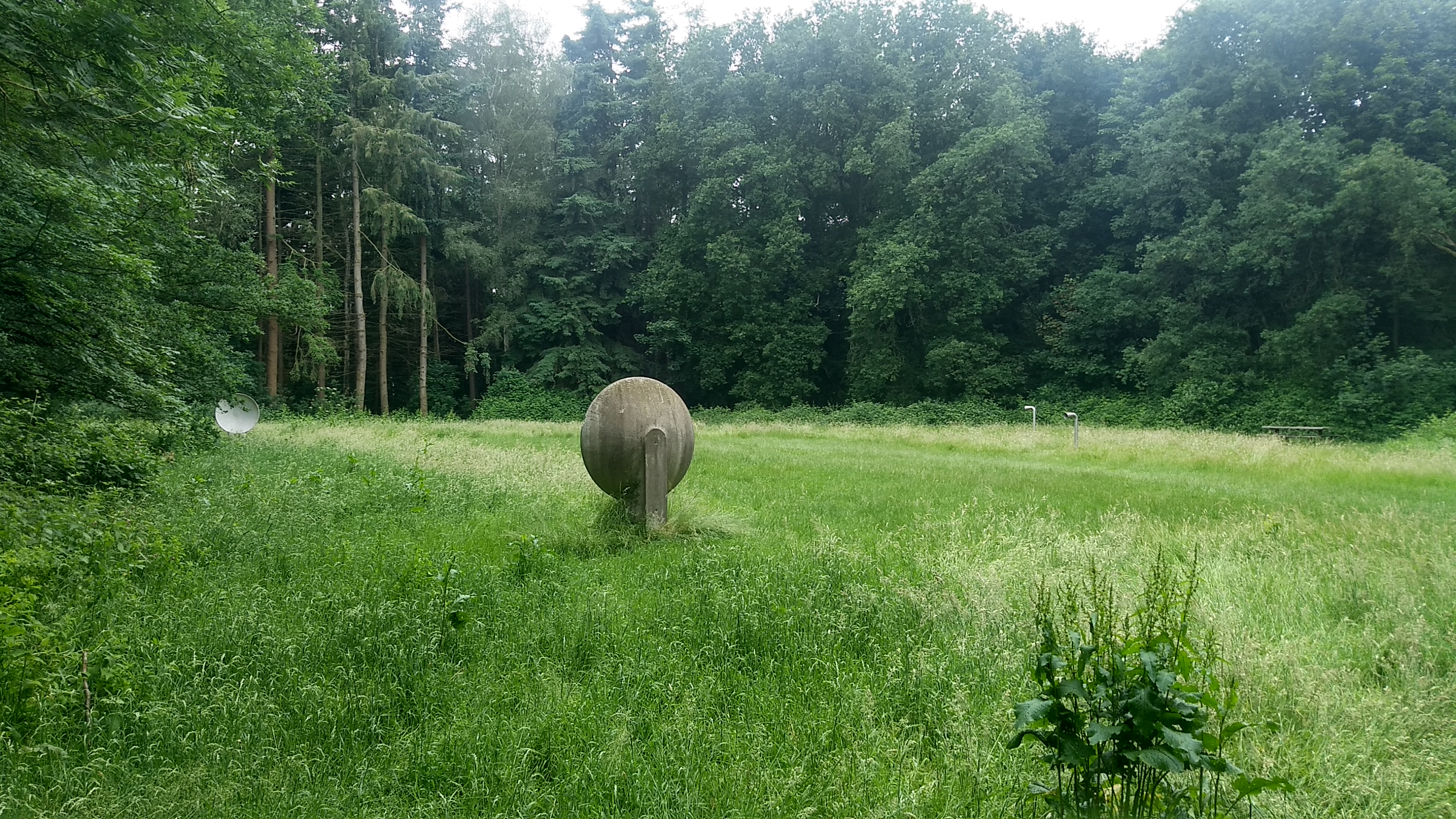
A pair of smaller acoustic mirrors in a park in Muiderberg

Parabolic acoustic mirrors called "whisper dishes" are used as participatory exhibits in science museums to demonstrate focusing of sound. Examples are located at Bristol's We The Curious, Ontario Science Centre, Albuquerque's ¡Explora!, Baltimore's Maryland Science Center, Oklahoma City's Science Museum Oklahoma, San Francisco's Exploratorium, the Science Museum of Minnesota, the Museum of Science and Industry in Chicago, Pacific Science Center in Seattle, Jodrell Bank Observatory, St. Louis Science Center, Parkes Observatory in Australia and on the north campus lawn of North Carolina State University.

A pair of dishes, typically 2 to 3 m (7 to 10 ft) in diameter, is installed facing each other, separated by around a hundred metres (yards). A person standing at the focus of one can hear another person speaking in a whisper at the focus of the other, despite the wide separation between them.

Parabolic microphones depend on a parabolic dish to reflect sound coming from a specific direction into the microphone placed at the focus. They are extremely directional: sensitive to sounds coming from a specific direction. However, they generally have poor bass response because a dish that is small enough to be portable cannot focus the longer wavelengths of low frequencies.

Small portable parabolic microphones are used to record wildlife sounds such as bird song, in televised sports events to pick up the conversations of players, such as in the huddle during American Football games, or to record the sounds of the sport, and in audio surveillance to record speech without the knowledge of the speaker.

== Locations ==
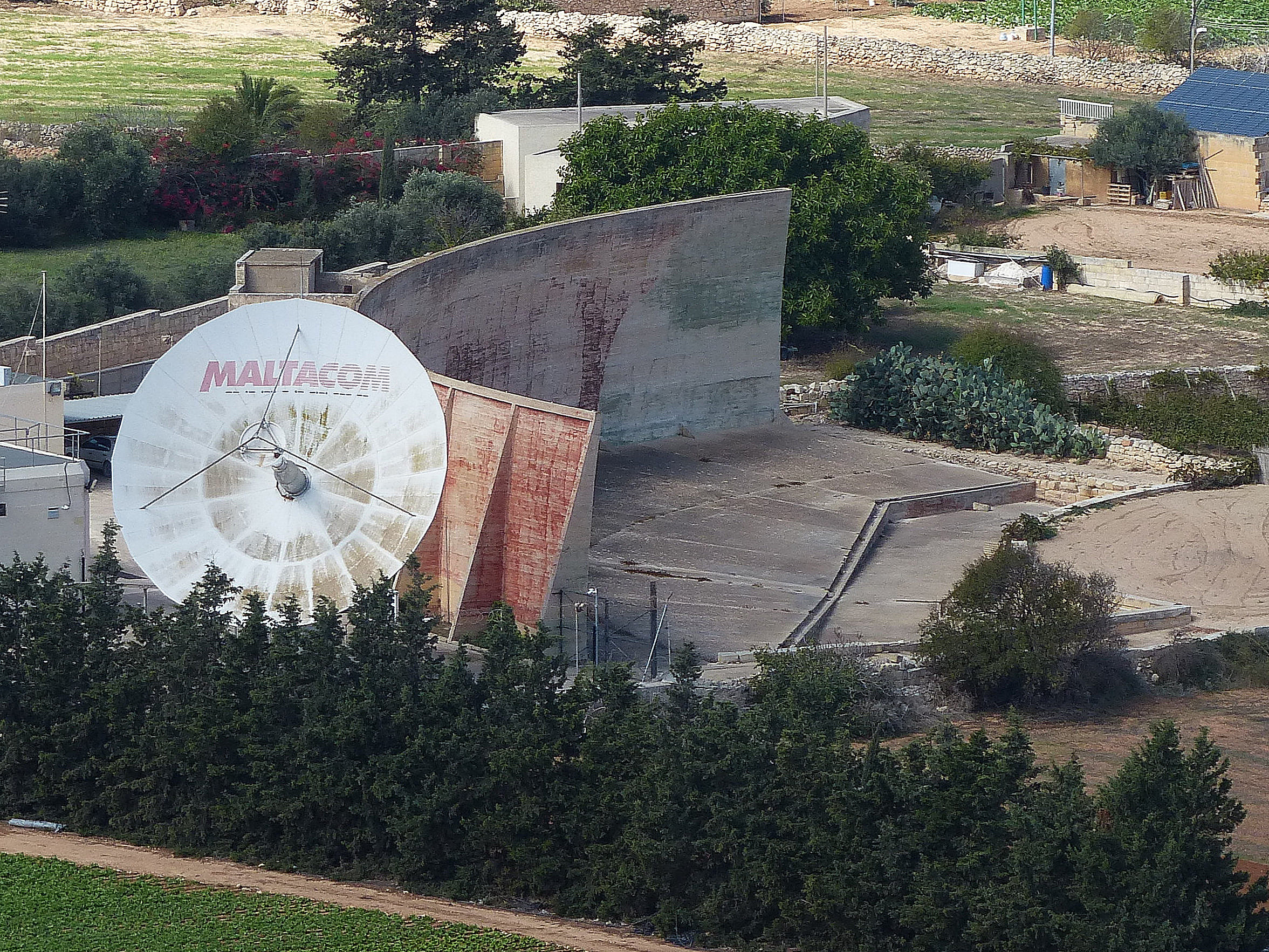
Magħtab acoustic mirror (Maltese: il-Widna: "the ear") on the north coast of Malta (35°55′51.78″N 14°26′37.03″E)

Acoustic aircraft detection mirrors are known to have been built at:

- Denge, Kent
- Abbot's Cliff, Kent (at OS grid reference TR27083867)
- Boulby, Yorkshire
- Dover, Kent, at Fan Bay (OS grid reference TR352428)
- Hartlepool, County Durham, in the Clavering area
- Hythe, Kent
- Malta – five sound mirrors were planned for Malta, serialled alphabetically, but only the Magħtab wall is known to have been built:
  - A. Il-Widna, "the ear": Magħtab
  - B. Zonkor
  - C. Ta Karach
  - D. Ta Zura
  - E. Tal Merhla
- Joss Gap, Kent
- Kilnsea, Yorkshire
- Leros, Greece
- Redcar, Yorkshire
- Seaham, County Durham
- Selsey, Sussex – converted into a residence
- Sunderland, at Namey Hill (OS grid reference NZ38945960)
- Warden Point, Isle of Sheppey, Kent – the Warden Point mirror, sited on a cliff-top, fell onto the beach below ca 1978-9

Modern acoustic mirrors built for entertainment

- Pennypot, Royal Military Canal
- Wat Tyler country park, near Pitsea, Essex – modern sculpture in the form of functional sonic mirrors
- The Brickyard (NC State) – North Carolina State University campus
- Discovery Green in downtown Houston, which has a sculpture made of limestone called the Listening Vessels
- Very Large Array – Socorro County, New Mexico Visitor Center has a 'whispering gallery' pair of dishes
- Planetanya, Israel – At the space and science visitor center, in the scientific garden
- Tūhura Otago Museum, Dunedin, New Zealand – A pair of 'whisper dishes' is situated outside of the Museum's entrance
- Luxembourg Science Center, Luxembourg – 2 parabolic antennas are situated in front of the Museum

== See also ==
- Acoustic location
- Sound ranging, for the artillery use
- Parabolic microphone
- Whispering gallery
- Whispering-gallery wave
