= Gabal Edmonstone =

Mountain in Cairo, Egypt

Coordinates: 25°40′01″N 28°42′09″E

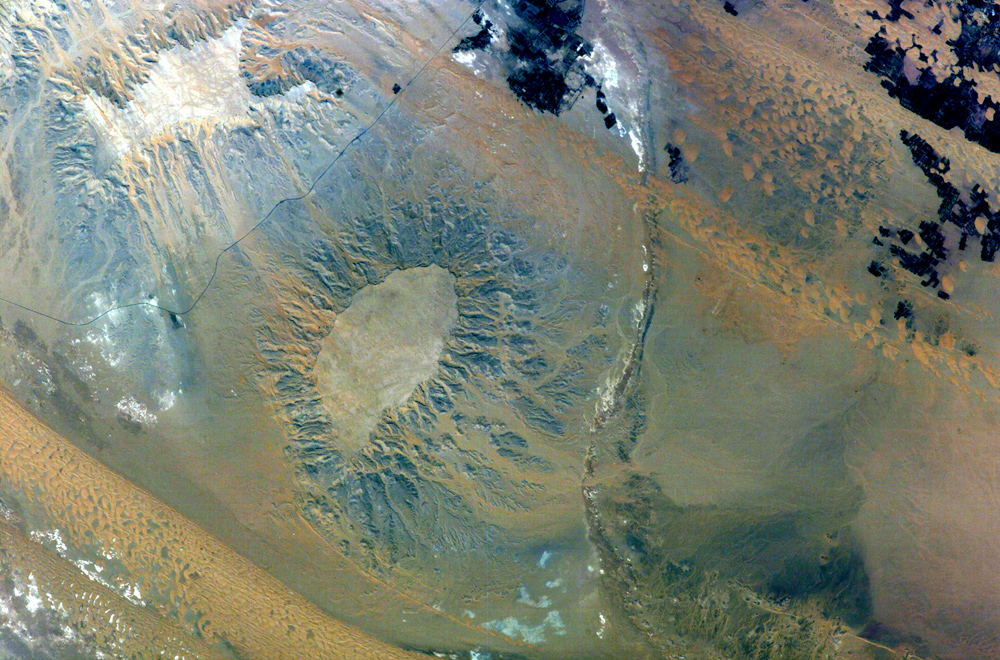
This astronaut photo of Gabal Edmonstone has been processed to enhance color variations in the various rock and soil units (more information).

Gabal Edmonstone is a flat-topped mesa located near the Dakhla Oasis south of Cairo, Egypt. It is a remnant of an eroding scarp that extends for over 200 kilometers (120 mi) east-southeast to west-northwest. The flat caprock of both the scarp and Mount Edmonstone is chalky limestone underlain by fossil-bearing shale and fine-grained sedimentary rocks.
