= Luxembourg Science Center =

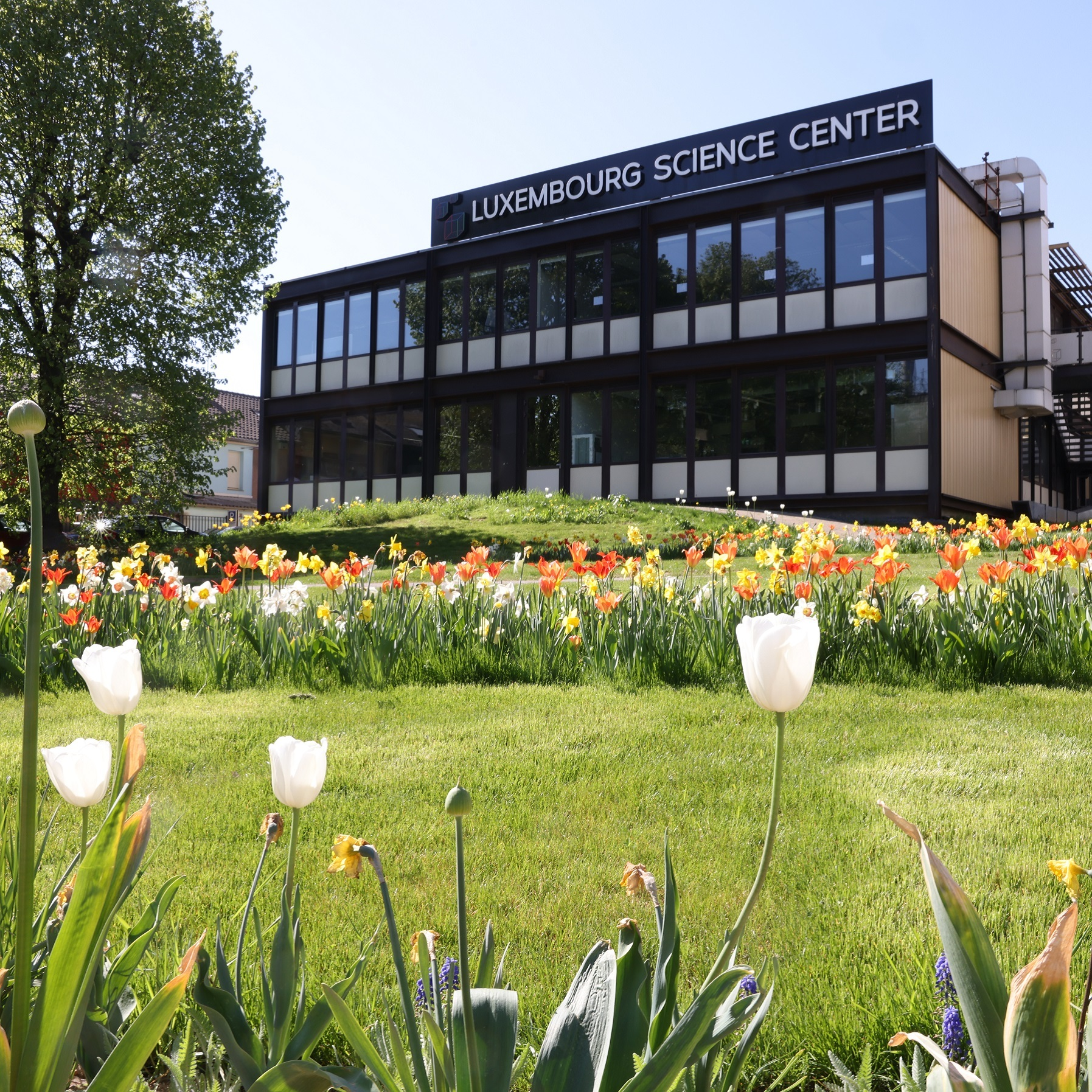
- Location: Luxembourg
- Coordinates: 49°31′20″N 5°53′44″E
- Type: Science museum
- Website: science-center.lu
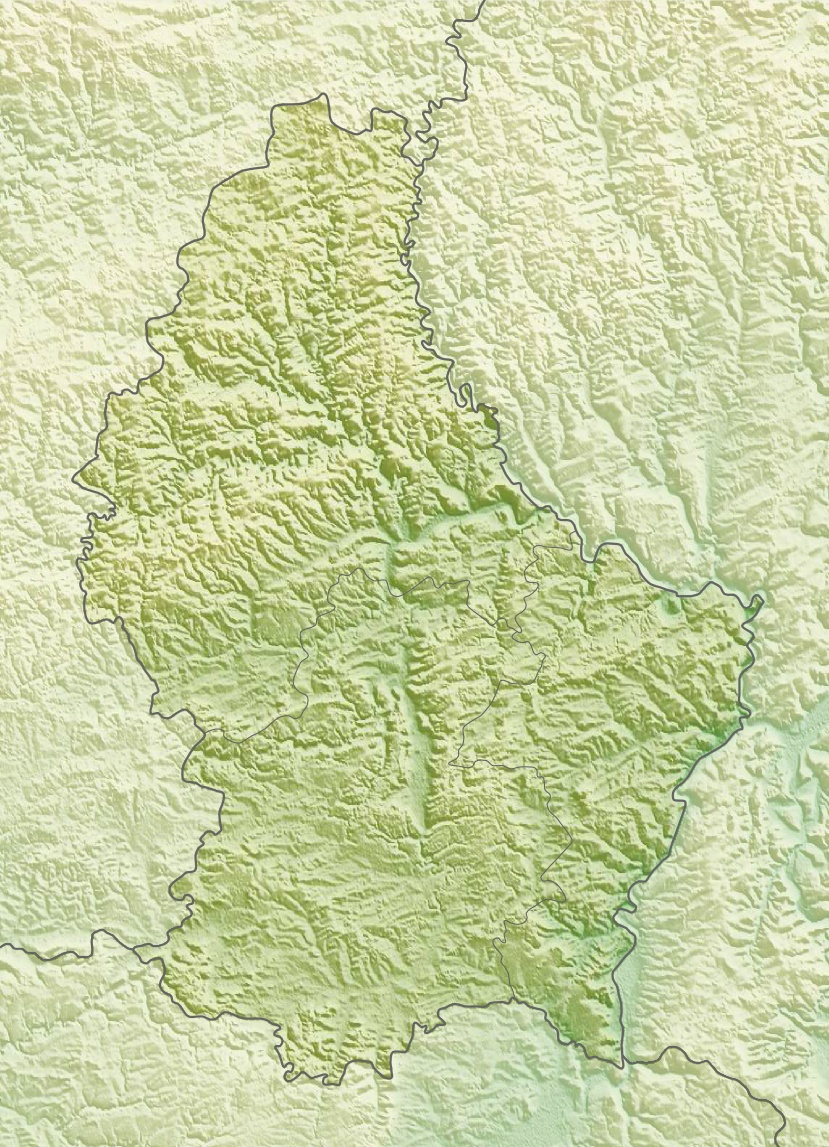
- Location of Luxembourg Science Center

The Luxembourg Science Center is a science and technology museum located in Differdange.

It includes more than 80 interactive stations and several «Science Shows» on different themes: mechanics, electricity, magnetism, low-temperature fluids, materials, optics, acoustics and astronomy.

== History ==
The Luxembourg science center project began with the classification of two national monuments at the ArcelorMittal site in Differdange: the Groussgasmaschinn facility, classified in August 2007, and the adjacent building (Gas Power Station), classified in November 2018.

In May 2016 work began on fitting out the “Léierbud” building to house the Science Center leading to the official opening in October 2017.

In June 2018 the ESERO Luxembourg (European Space Education Resource Office) -project was launched: a continuous training program for teachers and STEM awareness raising funded by the European Space Agency, the Luxembourg Space Agency and the Ministry of Education.

A 20-meter planetarium was inaugurated in December 2021.
