= RAF Denge =

Former RAF site in Kent, England

RAF Denge
- Dungeness, Kent in England

Site information
- Type: Royal Air Force station
- Owner: Air Ministry
- Operator: Royal Air Force

Location
- Shown within Kent RAF Denge (the United Kingdom)
- Coordinates: 50°57′22″N 0°57′14″E

Site history
- Built: 1920s
- In use: 1920s - 1932

Royal Air Force Denge or more simply RAF Denge is a former Royal Air Force station near Dungeness, in Kent, England. It is best known for the early experimental acoustic mirrors which remain there.

The RAF had begun research into acoustic mirrors during World War I.

The Denge acoustic mirrors, known colloquially as 'listening ears', are located between Greatstone-on-Sea and Lydd Airport, on the banks of a now disused gravel pit. The mirrors were built in the late 1920s and early 1930s as an experimental early warning system for incoming aircraft, developed by William Sansome Tucker. Several were built along the south and east coasts, but the complex at Denge is the best preserved, and are protected as scheduled monuments.

== Denge complex ==
There are three acoustic mirrors in the complex, each consisting of a single concrete hemispherical reflector.

- The 200 foot mirror is a near vertical, curved wall, 200 feet (60m) long. It is one of only two similar acoustic mirrors in the world, the other being in Magħtab, Malta.

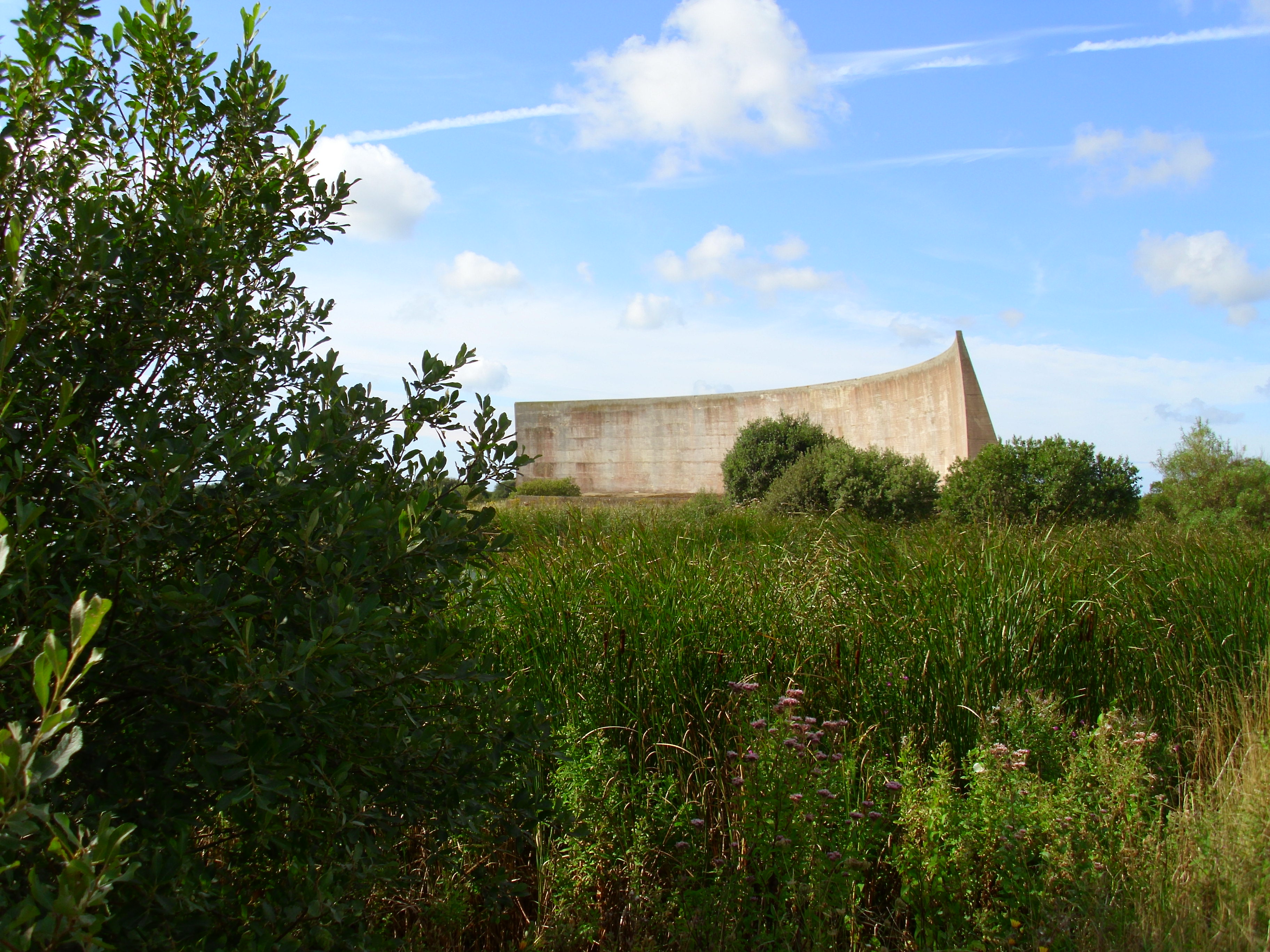
200 ft Acoustic mirror at Denge

- The 30 foot mirror is a circular dish, similar to a deeply curved satellite dish, 9 m (30 ft) across, supported on concrete buttresses. This mirror still retains the metal microphone pole at its centre.
- The 20 foot mirror is similar to the 30 foot mirror, with a smaller, shallower dish 6 m (20 ft) across. The design is close to that of an acoustic mirror in Kilnsea, East Riding of Yorkshire.

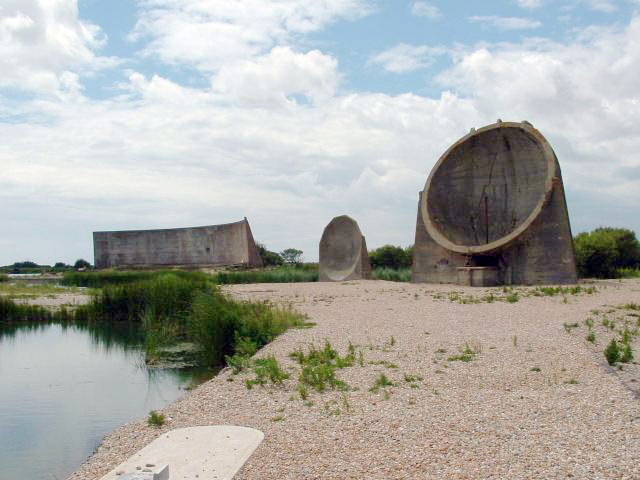
View of all three mirrors

Acoustic mirrors did work and could effectively be used to detect slow moving enemy aircraft before they came into sight. They worked by concentrating sound waves towards a central point, where a microphone would have been located. However, their use was limited as aircraft became faster. Operators also found it difficult to distinguish between aircraft and seagoing vessels. In any case, they quickly became obsolete due to the invention of radar in 1932. The experiment was abandoned, and the mirrors left to decay. The gravel extraction works caused some undermining of at least one of the structures.

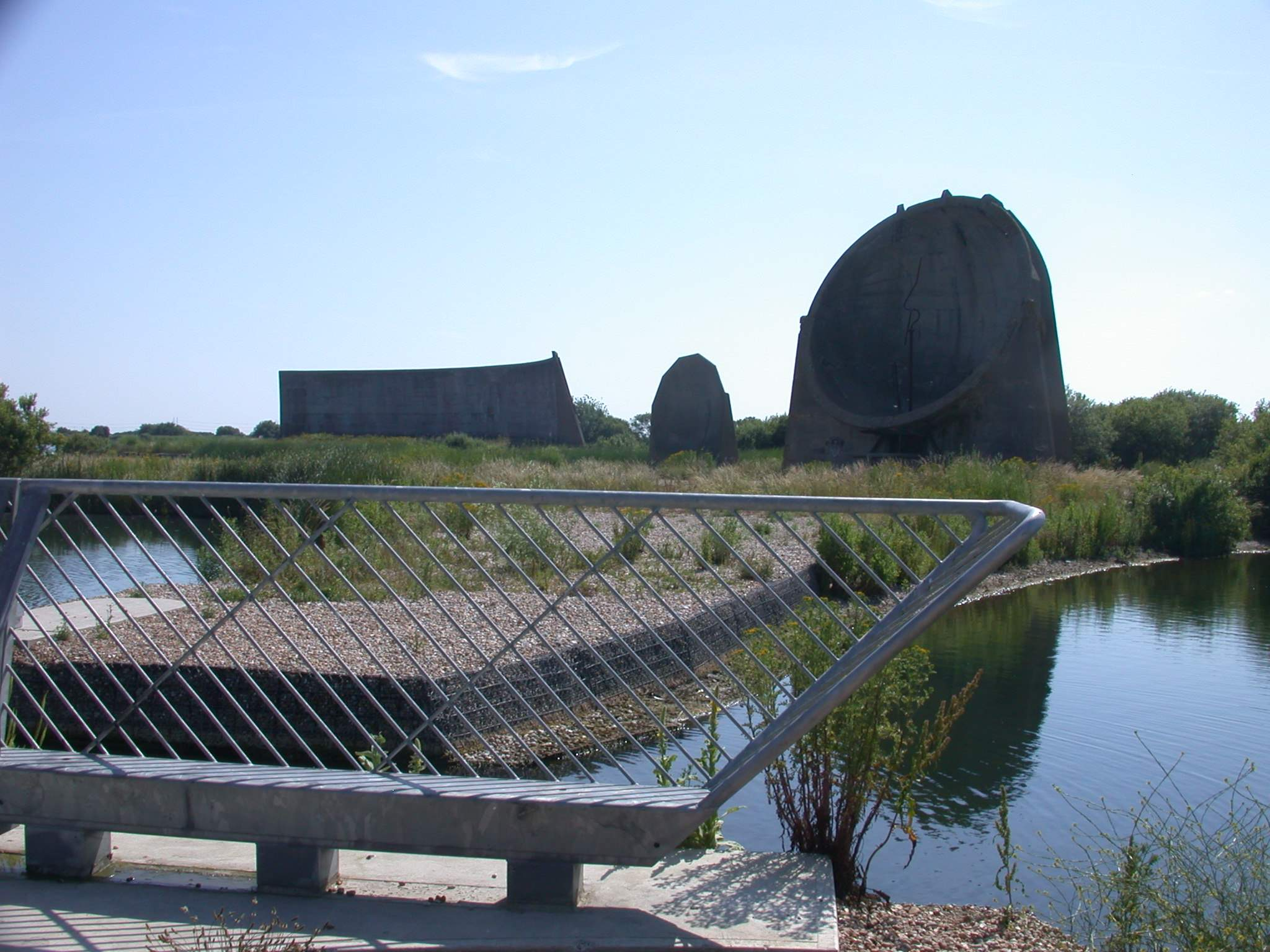
The mirrors with the swing bridge visible in the foreground

The striking forms of the sound mirrors have attracted artists and photographers. British artist Tacita Dean created a film inspired by the complex. The band Turin Brakes featured the mirrors on some of their album covers. The object appeared in the music video for Blank & Jones' "A Forest".The mirrors have also been featured in the music videos for "Last Time Forever" by Squeeze, Invaders Must Die by The Prodigy, Young Kato - Something Real and "A Kiss For The Whole World x" by Enter Shikari. Nicki Minaj also used the site for her music video "Freedom".

== Restoration ==
In 2003, English Heritage secured £500,000 from the Aggregates Levy Sustainability Fund and from the EU's Interreg programme under the Historic Fortifications Network, as administered by Kent County Council. This money was spent to restore the damage caused by the gravel works, as well as to install a swing bridge which now is the only means of access, reducing the monument's exposure to vandalism. The mirrors are situated on an island within an RSPB nature reserve, and can only be accessed on open days as the designated site (which has both Site of Special Scientific Interest and Special Protection Area status) is sensitive to disturbance.
