= Ġebel San Pietru =

Hill in Għargħur, Malta

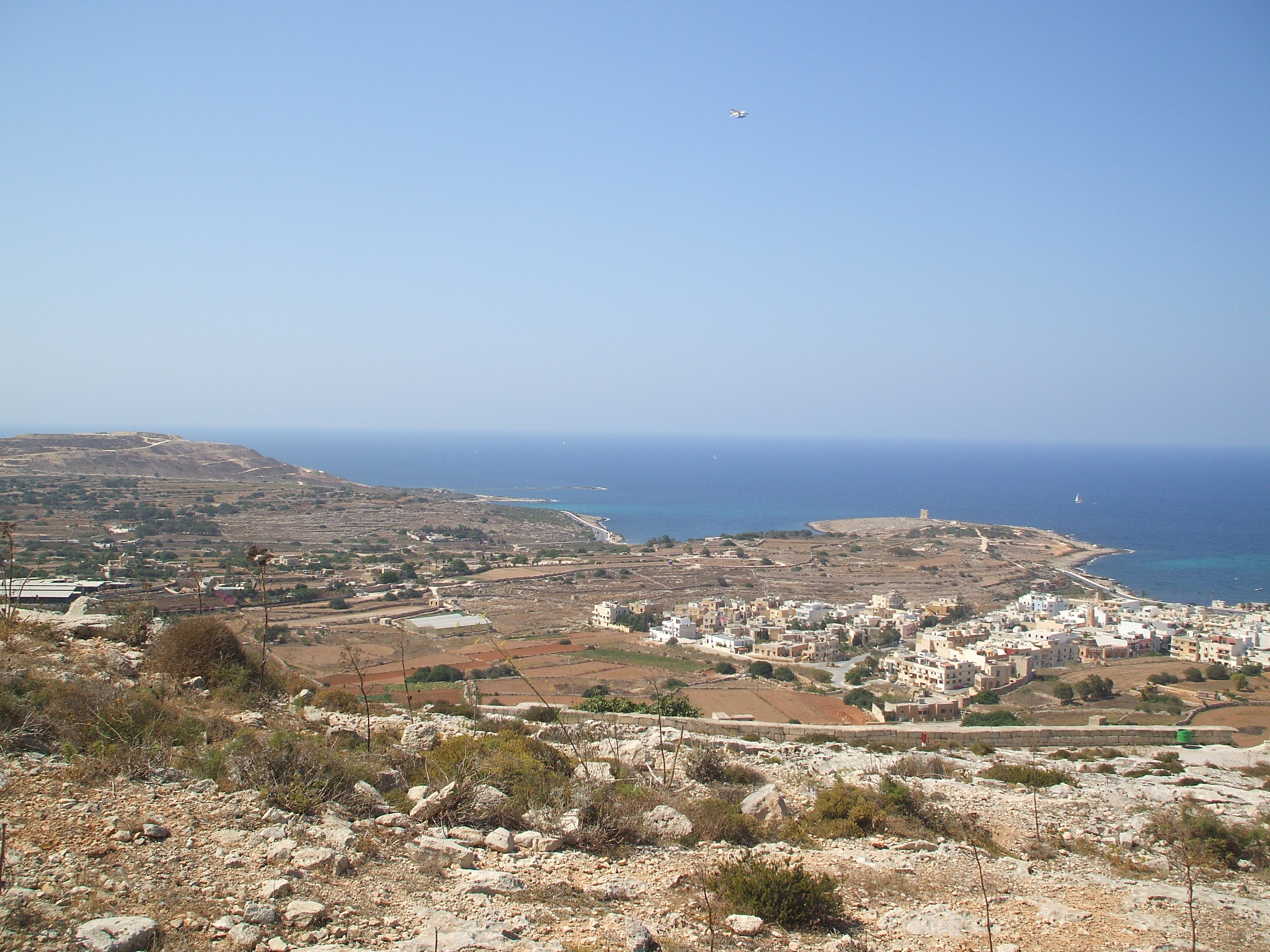
- View from Għargħur, showing Baħar iċ-Ċagħaq and Magħtab

Highest point
- Elevation: 150 m (490 ft)
- Coordinates: 35°55′40″N 14°27′08″E

Geography
- Location within Malta
- Location: Għargħur, Malta

Ġebel San Pietru is a hill located on Għargħur Hill in Għargħur, Malta, with an altitude of 150 metres (492 ft). Foreigners call it the Top of The World, whilst the locals call it L-Anċirietka. Locals and tourists often hike here.

Għaxqet L-Għajn is the road which passes through the hill.

The Victoria Lines are located nearby.

== See also ==
- Geography of Malta
