= Georg Gebel (the elder) =

Georg Gebel (1685–1750) was a German composer, organist, and innovator in the construction of keyboard instruments.

Gebel was born in Breslau, which was then part of Bohemia. He became a tailor's apprentice, but ran away from the apprenticeship to study music. He studied under Winkler and Krause, and became organist at Brieg in 1709 and at Breslau in 1713. He died in Breslau in 1750. Silesia where he lived had been transferred from Bohemia to being in the Kingdom of Prussia in 1742.

He invented a clavichord with quarter tones and a clavicymbalum with a pedal keyboard. His numerous compositions were not published, but included an oratorio, cantatas, masses, psalms, canons, organ pieces, and clavichord music.

His son, Georg Gebel the Younger, was also a noted musician and composer.
