= Georg Gebel (the younger) =

German musician and composer (1709–1753)

Georg Gebel (25 October 1709 – 24 September 1753) was a German musician and composer.

Gebel was born in Brieg, Silesia (present-day Brzeg, Poland) to Georg Gebel the Elder, also a musician and composer. He studied music under his father, and in 1729 became second organist at the church of St. Mary Magdalene in Breslau (present-day Wrocław), as well as Kapellmeister to the Duke of Oels. He joined Heinrich von Brühl's orchestra in Dresden in 1735, where he met Pantaleon Hebenstreit, the inventor of the pantalon, and learned to play that instrument. In 1747 he was appointed Kapellmeister to John Frederick, Prince of Schwarzburg-Rudolstadt. He died in Rudolstadt in 1753.

Gebel was a prolific composer. While in Breslau, he wrote a variety of instrumental and vocal music, and while in Rudolstadt, wrote 12 operas, two Passions, two Christmas cantatas, sets of cantatas for several years, more than 100 orchestral symphonies, partitas, concertos, and so on.

== Works ==
- 144 cantatas
- 4 Kyrie
- Passionsmusik in 6 parts for soloist, chorus, and orchestra (HKR 976)
- Weihnachtsoratorium (HKR 843)
- Neujahrsoratorium (HKR 827)

== Recordings ==
- Georg Gebel: Weihnachtsoratorium and Neujahrsoratorium; Cantus Thuringia und Capella Thuringia, Leitung: Bernhard Klapprott, with Monika Mauch, Kai Wessel, Nico van der Meel, Peter Kooy, (Classic Production Osnabrück, Audio CD 2004)
- Georg Gebel: Johannes Passion, with: Ludger Rémy, Dorothee Mields, Henning Voss, Jan Kobow, Klaus Mertens, Sebastian Bluth, Canto Weimar and Weimar Baroque Ensembles (Classic Production Osnabrück, Audio CD 2004)
- Christmas Cantatas Vol. 1 Verfolge mich, o Welt; Gott Lob! Mein Jesus macht mich rein, Veronika Winter, Britta Schwarz, Andreas Post, Matthias Vieweg, Les Amis de Philippe, Ludger Remy CPO, 2010
- Christmas Cantatas Vol. 2 forthcoming
