= New Romney railway station =

Railway station in Kent, England

Coordinates: 50.986°N 0.954°E

New Romney
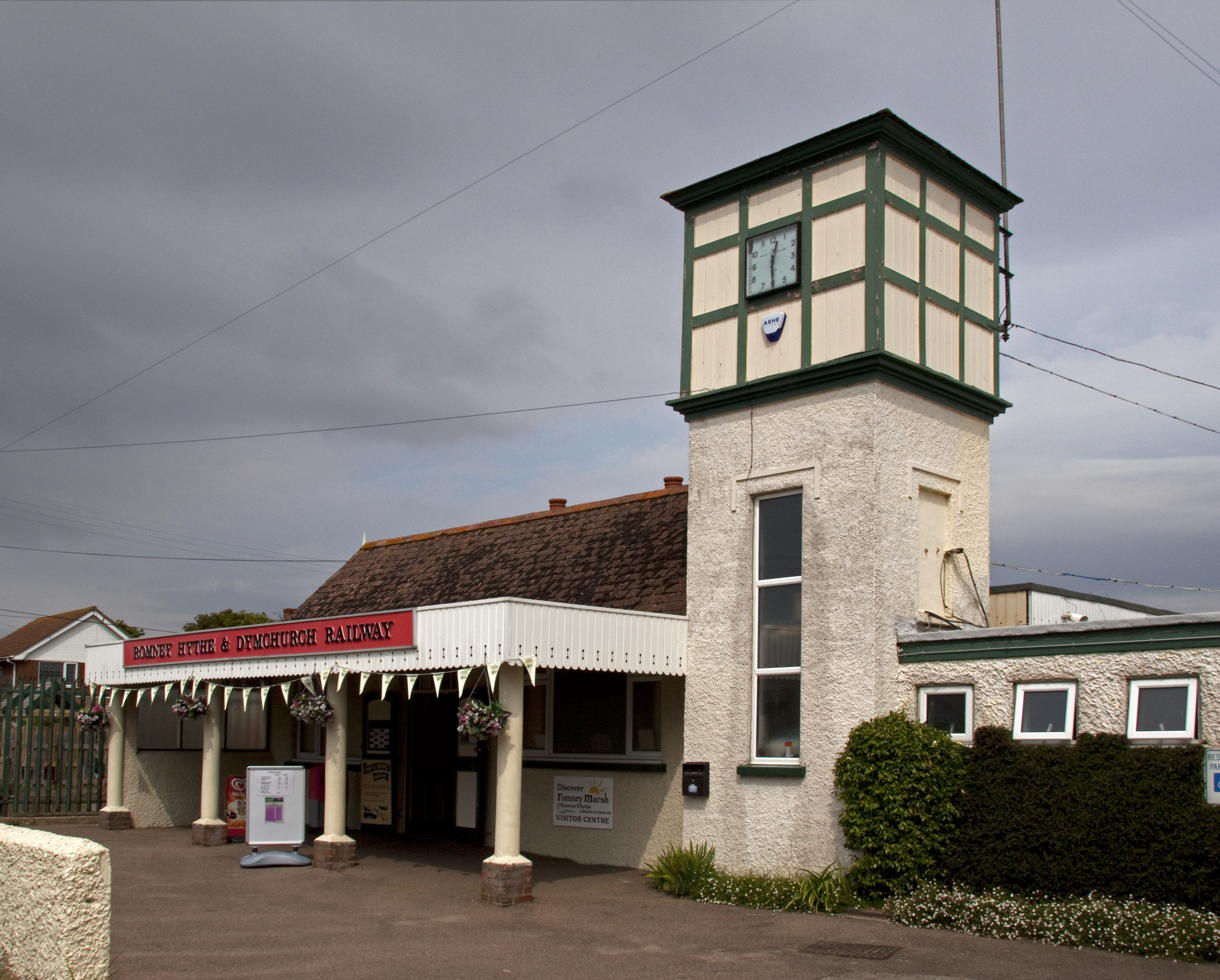
- New Romney station

General information
- Location: New Romney, Folkestone & Hythe; England
- Grid reference: TR074248
- System: Station on heritage railway
- Manager: RHDR
- Platforms: 4

Key dates
- 16 July 1927: Opened
- 1940: closed
- 1946: reopened
Location

New Romney railway station is a station on the Romney, Hythe and Dymchurch Railway in New Romney, Kent, England. It has always been the headquarters location of the railway.

== Temporary terminus ==
Until the opening of the Dungeness extension in 1928, New Romney was the terminus for trains from Hythe. The platforms were located in the area in front of the restaurant and model exhibition. The opening of the Dungeness extension required the construction of new platforms at a lower level, the original platforms being at road-level, and therefore inappropriate for accessing the road under-bridge by which the new Dungeness tracks passed under the adjacent main road. The current station was built in the 1930s, and retained the split-level organisation, with high-level terminating platforms, and low-level through platforms to Dungeness.

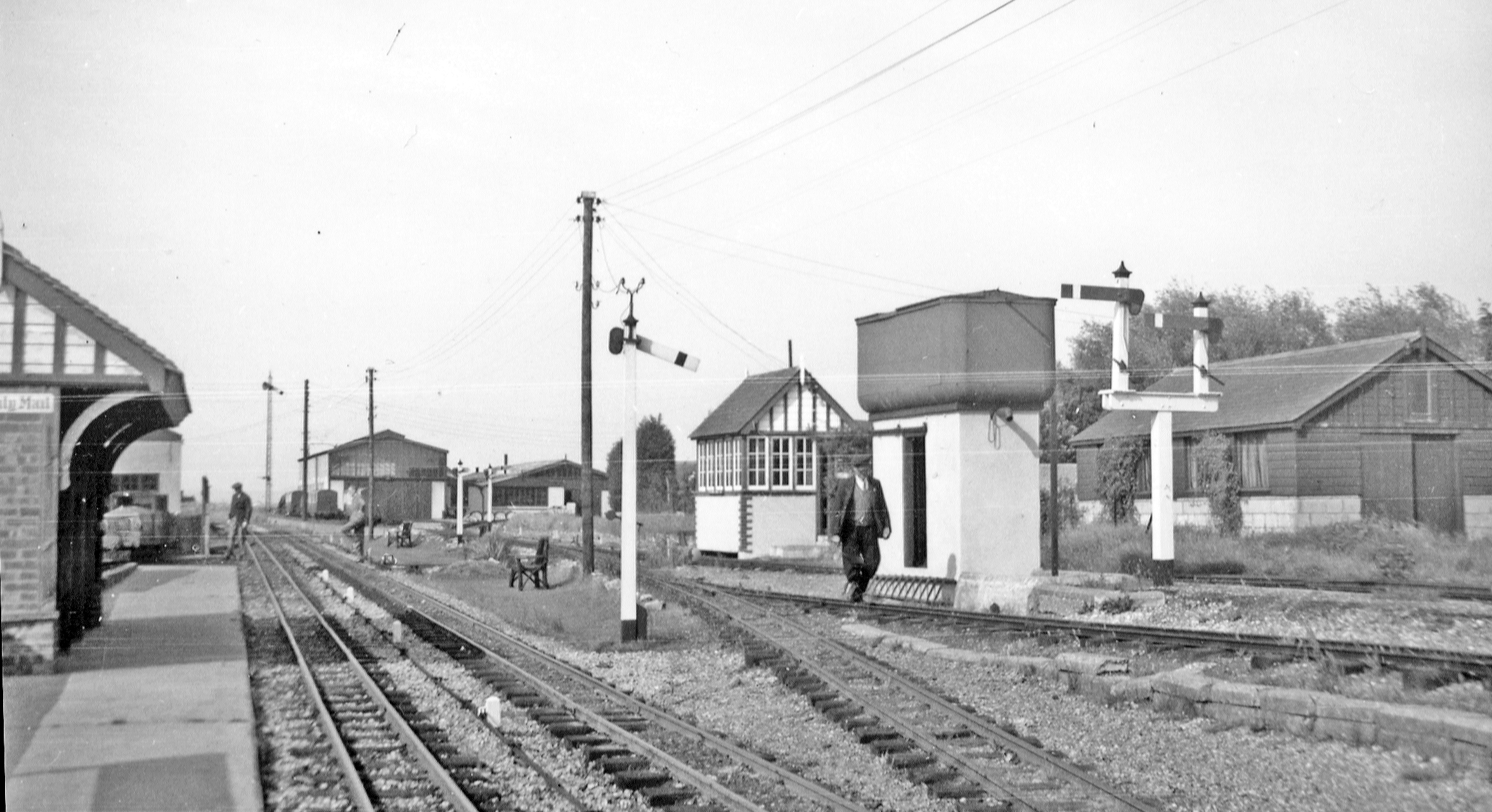
New Romney station, 1938

The railway closed in 1940 when it was taken over the military but the railway re-opened in 1946 after the second world war New Romney was again a temporary terminus, until the Dungeness extension had been repaired and reduced to a single-track operation. New Romney was the scene of the famous newsreel of Laurel and Hardy reopening the Dungeness line in 1947.

== Station rebuilding ==
The evolution of New Romney station has been somewhat organic, with work taking place over a span of many years. However, the late 1970s saw a very significant reconstruction of the station, with the provision of an all-over station roof, and the expansion of the low-level through platforms. A total of 9 'effective' platform roads existed following this rebuild. Two platforms remained (but without designation) at the old high-level station; a further four were provided under the station roof, numbered platforms 1, 2, 3, and 4; an additional three lines ran parallel, also under the main roof, but without physical platform surfaces, being designed for storage of passenger coaches. The high-level platforms saw very little subsequent use, other than for storage of rolling stock, and were largely removed (apart from short stubs) in the early 1980s. Finally, in the 1990s, the relocation of the main locomotive turntable led to the removal of all trace of the old high-level platforms, whose physical location has now been entirely taken over by extensions to the station restaurant.

== Facilities and departmental bases ==
=== Company offices ===
The registered office of the railway company is located on the station site, although it has a separate entrance from the main road. Commonly known as the 'front office' this is the centre of corporate administration. There are also offices within the station site for the railway's General Manager, and for the principal departmental managers (operations, commercial, engineering).

=== Station operations ===
As a major railway station, the site necessarily includes a large booking office, shop, and cafeteria. There is also an extensive museum and model exhibition hall.

=== Train control ===
There is a signal box for local train control, and also the main Control Centre for train operation across the whole railway. The latter is staffed by a Control Officer, who is in constant radio contact with all signal boxes, locomotives, and (where appropriate) station staff, travelling guards, and engineering teams.

=== Locomotive storage and maintenance ===
The original engine shed is still in use, but was designed to accommodate only nine locomotives. In recent years it has been considerably extended, more than doubling the original size. This shed is now capable of housing all the railway's locomotives, as well as an engineering centre capable of work from minor running repairs to full locomotive overhauls, together with the necessary mess facilities for engineering staff. Also on the New Romney site are a separate locomotive erecting shop, and a paint shop where locomotives and other rolling stock can be re-liveried. Although there is a secondary engine shed at Hythe station, all locomotives are now based at New Romney locomotive shed.

=== Permanent Way headquarters ===
The Permanent Way department is also headquartered at New Romney. Its original premises have also proved inadequate, and a large new Permanent Way Shed has recently been constructed just outside (and north of) the main station site. This shed contains extensive storage space as well as running lines for the storage of the department's light locomotives, mess coach, and wagons.

=== Heritage storage ===
The provision of a new Permanent Way headquarters has allowed the former facility to be given over to a small heritage group who are developing an archive of historical material and a small collection of restored heritage vehicles, which may be used on special trains.

=== Carriage and wagon ===
Carriages and wagons are built and maintained on-site at New Romney in a dedicated 'Carriage and Wagon Department'. Its shed was formerly one of the larger facilities at the station, but is now dwarfed by both the new Permanent Way Shed, and the extended Locomotive Shed.

=== Other facilities ===
Certain smaller departments are also based at New Romney, but are less evident as they occupy limited space. Examples include the 'Signals and Telecommunications Department' who maintain the railway's signalling infrastructure and internal communications, and the 'Commercial Department', responsible for marketing. The site also houses the other general facilities associated with major tourist destinations, such as lavatories, children's play area, picnic facilities, and a large car park. There is also some on-site accommodation for staff members and volunteers.

== Gallery ==
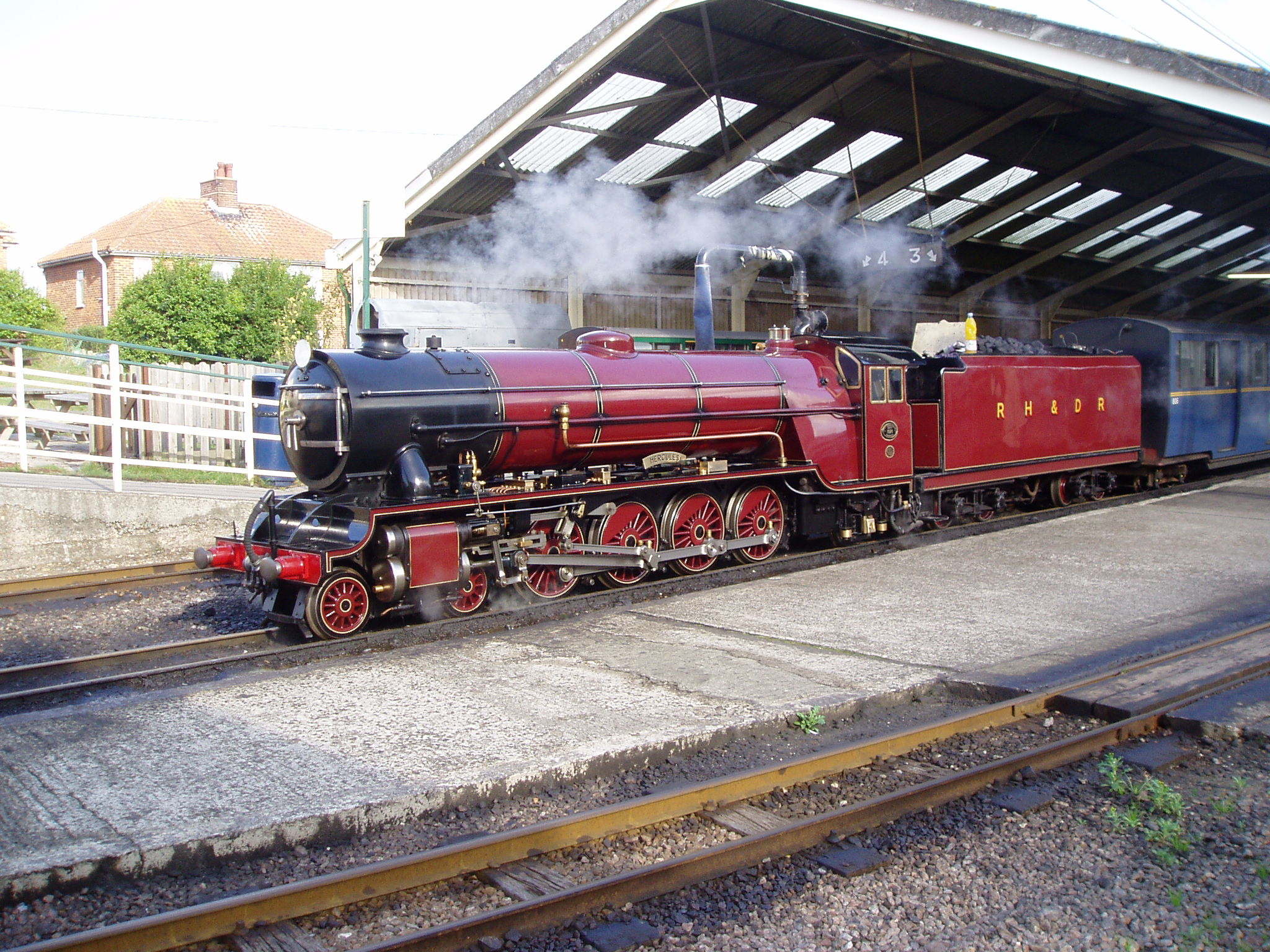
No 5 'Hercules' at New Romney

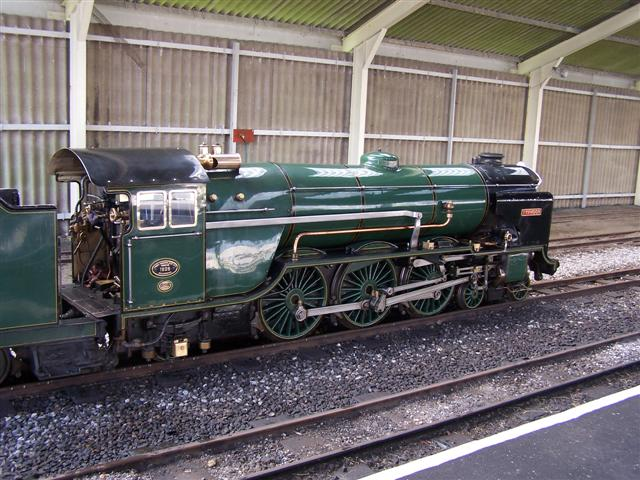
No.7 Typhoon in the carriage stabling sidings

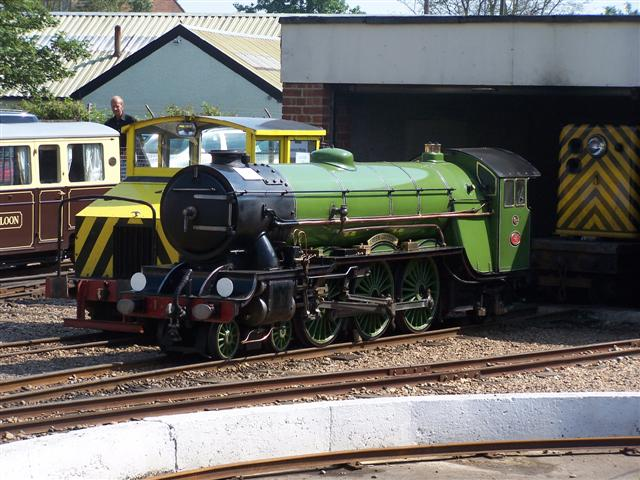
No.1 Green Goddess outside the former carriage sheds on the site of the original 1927 terminus

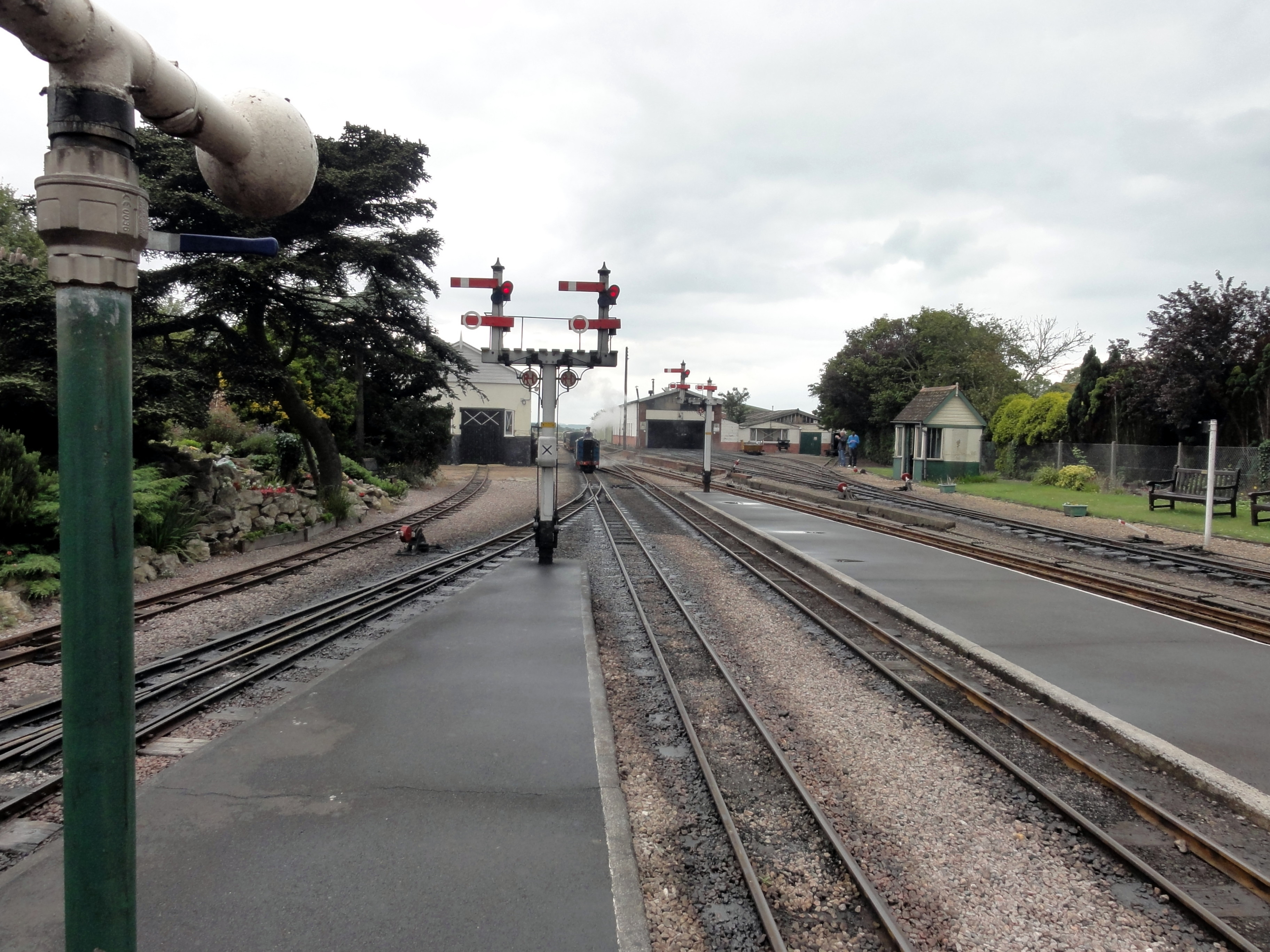
No.8 Hurricane seen from the platforms at New Romeny

Preceding station	Heritage railways	Following station
Romney Sands towards Dungeness	Romney, Hythe & Dymchurch Railway	Warren Halt towards Hythe
Former service
Greatstone Dunes Line open, station closed towards Dungeness	Romney, Hythe & Dymchurch Railway	Warren Halt Line and station open towards Hythe
