= Greatstone Dunes railway station =

Former railway station in England

Coordinates: 50°58′7.13″N 0°57′36.09″E

Greatstone Dunes
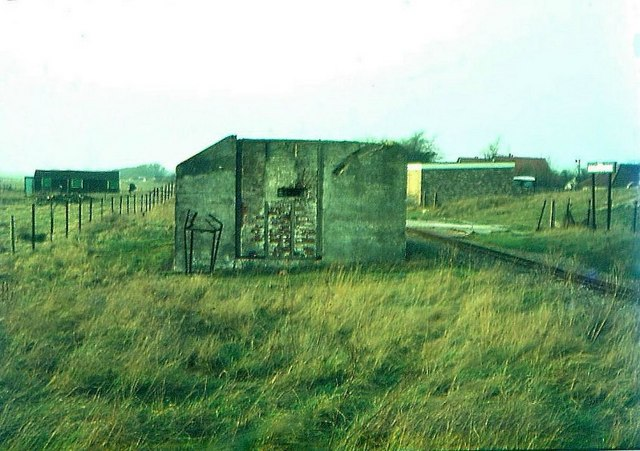
- Station in 1973

General information
- Location: Greatstone-on-Sea, Folkestone & Hythe; England
- Platforms: 2 (1928-1946) 1 (from 1946)

Other information
- Status: Disused

History
- Original company: RHDR

Key dates
- 24 May 1928: Opened
- 30 June 1940: closed
- 21 March 1947: reopened
- November 1983: Station closed to passengers
Location

Greatstone Dunes railway station was a station on the Romney, Hythe and Dymchurch Railway in Kent, England.

Opened on 24 May 1928, this station was located only 1.3 miles (2.1 km) south of the station at New Romney. However, there were extensive contemporary plans for the development of a new community of Greatstone-on-Sea. It was with this possible future traffic in mind that the station was built, and heavily equipped. Some records imply that the station may have been erected at the specific request of the building company contracted to construct the local houses, although the evidence remains ambiguous. The station was equipped with two platforms, with waiting rooms on each, including a ticket office, a signal box, and a water tower. Photographs taken in the 1920s and 1930s show a footbridge between the platforms, as does a 1930s railway advertising poster, but contemporary eye-witness accounts record that this footbridge was never completed, with no steps installed on either side. Photographic evidence from 1936 (Note: now in the 'Real Photographs Co.' collection) shows a tearoom on the seaward platform.

1930s railway poster

Although bungalows were constructed at Greatstone-on-Sea, the size of the development was considerably smaller than originally expected. When the railway re-opened after World War II, 'Greatstone Dunes' was renamed 'Greatstone Halt' unstaffed, with its buildings closed. The waiting room on the inland platform had been incorporated into an army pillbox during hostilities.

In 1950, tourist trade picked up, and travellers sought out the beaches at Greatstone. The halt was upgraded again to full station status, now known simply as 'Greatstone' (without the 'Dunes' suffix). The buildings were renovated or replaced, and staff were reinstated. This new lease of life lasted for 14 years. At some point (date unknown), the remaining original station buildings (on the original 'down' side of the line) were demolished and replaced with a modern shelter of breeze-block and timber design, with concrete platform and corrugated roof.

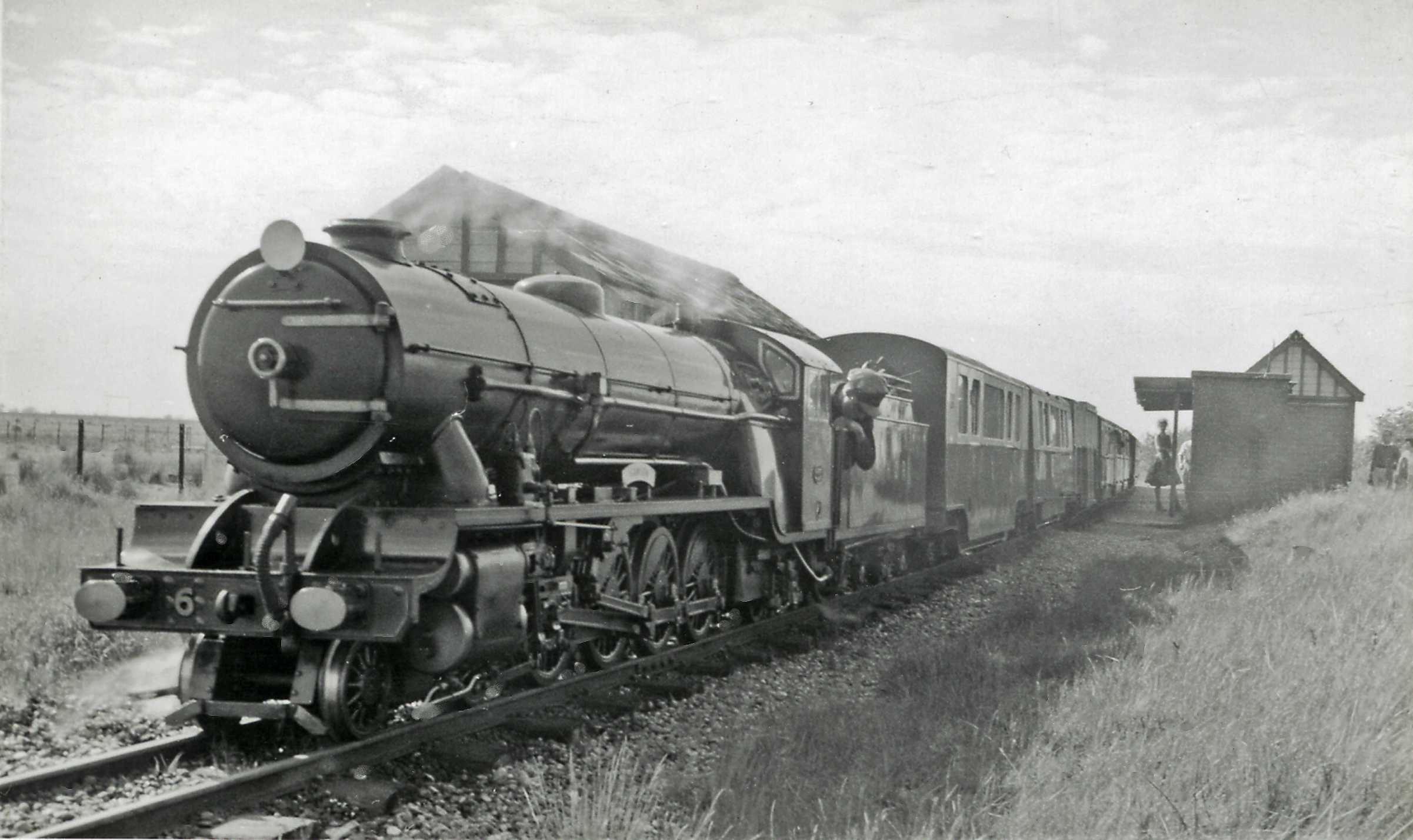
Hythe - Dungeness RH&DR train at Greatstone Dunes Halt, 1962

In 1964, staff were withdrawn and in 1970, the buildings were demolished. However, full station status was technically maintained right through until final closure. The publication "A Miniature Guide" was issued in 1981, and became the final official publication listing Greatstone station as fully operational. The station closed in 1983, despite the bizarre fact that it was still listed in the 1984 timetable, but with no times in any of the train columns. The 1985 timetable was the first one to have no mention of Greatstone station.

The site of the station is marked by the army pillbox, an access footpath from the nearby road (still open), and two poles which held the final station nameboard, the nameboard itself having been removed. There are no plans for the station to reopen.

== Notes ==
Preceding station	Heritage railways	Following station
Former service
Romney Sands Line and station open towards Dungeness	Romney, Hythe & Dymchurch Railway	New Romney Line and station open towards Hythe
