= Warren Halt railway station =

Former railway station in England

Coordinates: 50.99737°N 0.96027°E

Warren Halt
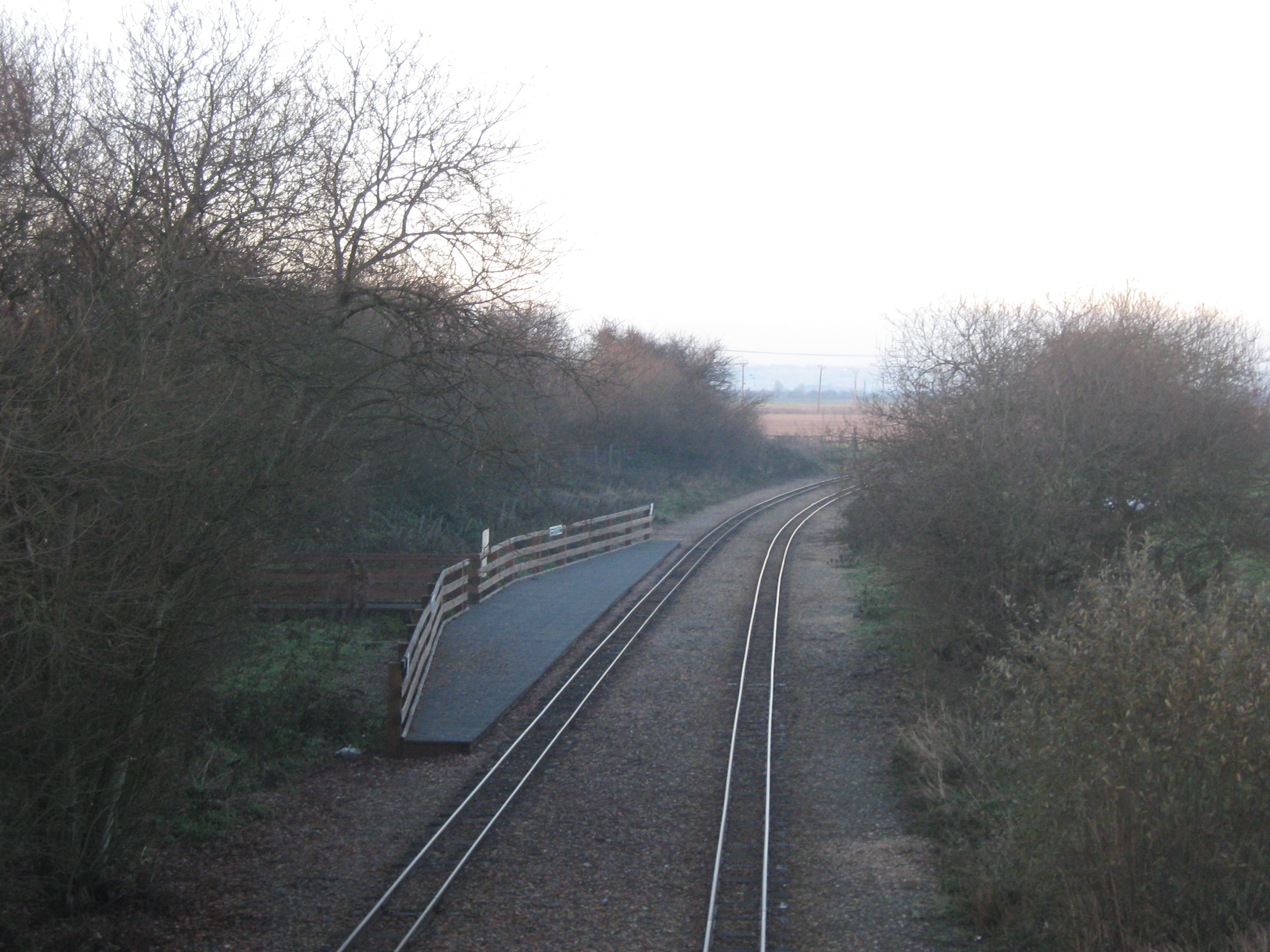

General information
- Location: New Romney, Folkestone & Hythe; England
- Platforms: 2 (reopened 2009 with 1)

Other information
- Status: Disused

History
- Pre-grouping: RHDR

Key dates
- 16 July 1927: Opened
- 1928: Closed to passengers
- 1946: Briefly re-opened
- 1946: Closed to passengers
- 19 February 2009: re-opened as Romney Warren Halt
Location

Romney Warren Halt railway station is a station on the Romney, Hythe and Dymchurch Railway in Kent, England. It has also been known as Warren Halt and Warren Bridge Halt.

== History ==
=== 1920s ===
Opened on 16 July 1927, this was one of three stations deliberately included in the timetable despite being sited far from a population centre, in the hope that their location near a bridge (Prince of Wales and Warren) or level crossing (Botolphs Bridge Road) would encourage traffic connecting from buses or other road transport. The experiment failed, in all three cases. Warren Halt closed later in the same year that it had opened (1927) and no longer appeared on timetables.

=== 1940s ===
In the immediately post-war timetable of 1946, the halt was briefly re-opened. The railway company had regained control from the War Office (the line had been a military railway from 1939 to 1945) and concentrated efforts on recovering custom on the main Hythe to New Romney section, of which Warren Halt was a part. However, the experiment with this little station was again deemed a failure, and it closed again at the end of 1946.

== Current use ==
The site at Romney Warren is now home to the Romney Marsh Visitor Centre. During 2008, in connection with the provision of transport links to the Centre, it was announced that Warren Halt was due to re-open in February 2009. In the Autumn of 2008 the railway's General Manager confirmed in newspaper reports that construction work had begun on the installation of platform facilities. The Romney Marsh Visitor Centre and Country Park authorities also publicised the re-opening as helping to providing 'green tourism' (tourism that is environmentally friendly). The actual re-opening ceremony took place on Monday 16 February; a special train (hauled by locomotive No 4) carried approximately 60 invited guests including local mayors, councillors, and Michael Howard (member of parliament for Shepway).

Passenger services to the station began later the same week, on Thursday 19 February 2009, and have continued on selected days annually since that time, and also for pre-booked private parties.

== Facilities ==
The original station never had any buildings or surfaced platforms, and for many years there was nothing to mark the site as trains passed by at speed. During late 2008 a single surfaced and fenced platform was laid on the up line, this being the line on which the Romney Marsh Visitor Centre shuttle trains began operating between New Romney and Warren Halt in February 2009. The surfacing and fencing was completed in December 2008, with partial funding by the local County Council and District Council, and with signage added in January 2009. The extensive rabbit warren from which both the station and this local area of New Romney take their name, is still very much evident, and large numbers of rabbits may be viewed from the train when passing the location.

Preceding station	Heritage railways	Following station
New Romney towards Dungeness	Romney, Hythe & Dymchurch Railway	St Mary's Bay towards Hythe
