= Romney, Hythe and Dymchurch Railway =

Light railway in Kent, England

Coordinates: 51°2′N 1°0′E

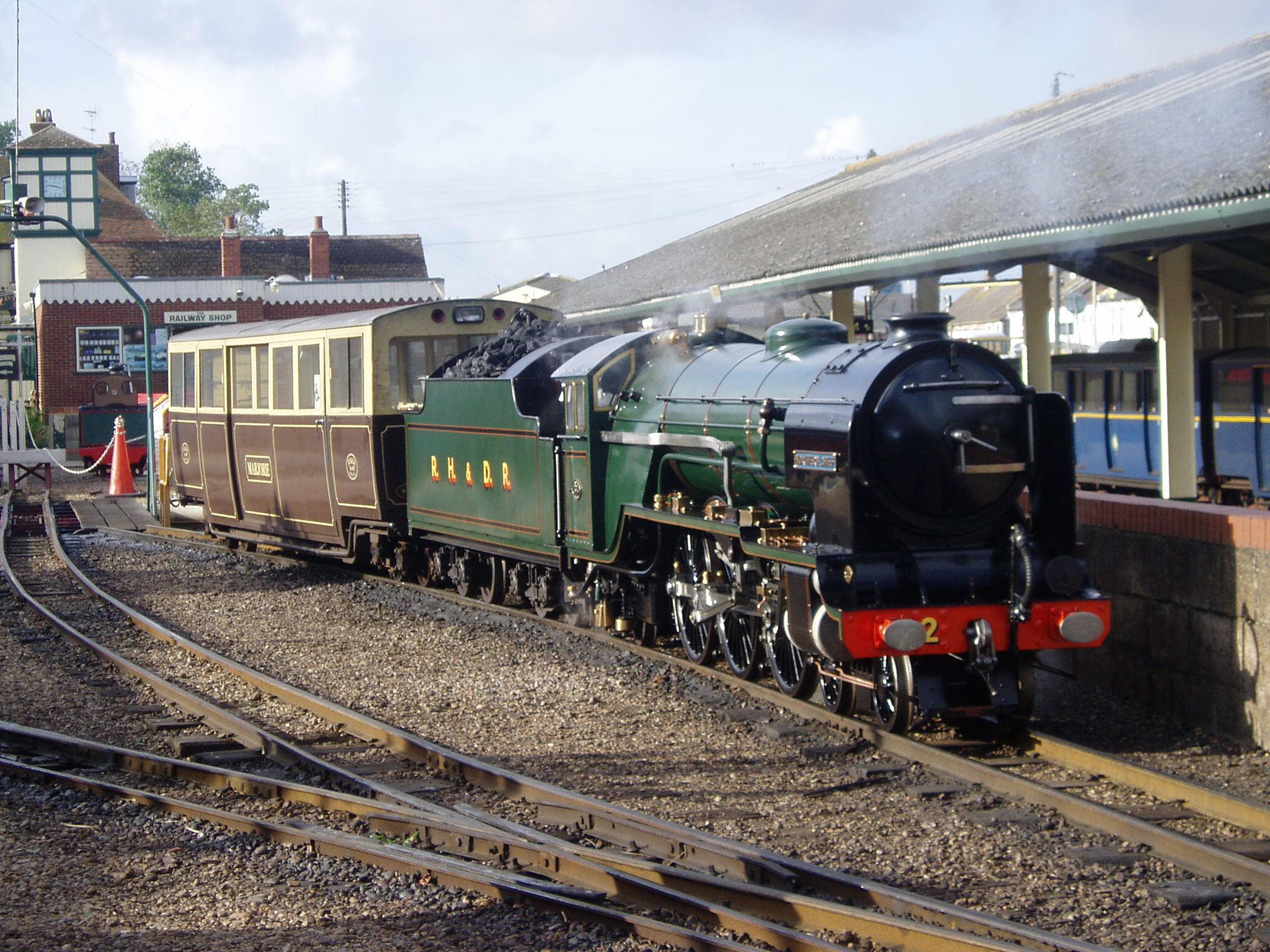
- Northern Chief at New Romney

Overview
- Locale: Kent, South East England
- Termini: Hythe; Dungeness
- Stations: 8
- Website: www.rhdr.org.uk

Service
- Type: Light railway
- Operator(s): Romney, Hythe and Dymchurch Railway Co.
- Depot: New Romney

History
- Opened: 1927

Technical
- Line length: 13 1/2 miles (21.7 km)
- Number of tracks: 2 (north of New Romney), 1 (south of New Romney with passing loops at the stations)
- Track gauge: 15 in (381 mm)
- Operating speed: 20 mph (32 km/h)
Route map
The Romney, Hythe and Dymchurch Railway, 1927 and 1928 sections, showing the location within Kent, and proximity to other railways. The red line is the boundary of Kent.

The Romney, Hythe and Dymchurch Railway (RH&DR) is a 15 in (381 mm) gauge light railway in Kent, England, operating steam and internal combustion locomotives. The 13 1/2-mile (21.7 km) line runs from the Cinque Port of Hythe via Dymchurch, St. Mary's Bay, New Romney and Romney Sands to Dungeness, close to the Dungeness nuclear power stations and Dungeness Lighthouse. The line is double track north of New Romney and single track south.

== History ==
=== Planning ===
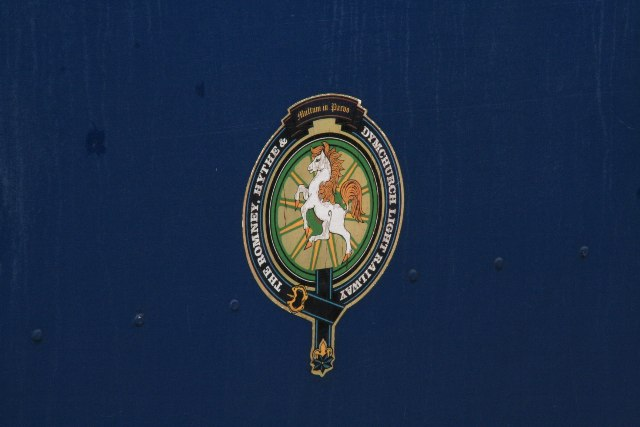
Romney, Hythe and Dymchurch Light Railway logo on carriage of train standing in Romney Sands Station

The railway was the dream of millionaire racing drivers Captain John Edwards Presgrave ("Jack") Howey and Count Louis Zborowski. The latter had constructed a railway at Higham Park, his home at Bridge, Kent, and agreed to donate the rolling stock and infrastructure to the project. However, he was killed in a motor racing accident at the Monza Grand Prix on 19 October 1924 before the Romney Marsh site was chosen, and Howey continued the project alone.

After Howey had unsuccessfully attempted to buy the Ravenglass and Eskdale Railway and extend it, he investigated a greenfield site between Burnham-on-Sea and Weston-super-Mare in Somerset and offered to buy the Hundred of Manhood and Selsey Tramway in Sussex, Henry Greenly drew Howey's attention to the potential for a 15-inch gauge line between New Romney and Hythe. Howey first visited New Romney on 8 September 1925 and decided there and then that it was an ideal location for his proposed railway.

The railway would cross public highways, and would need to acquire land from a number of different owners. Thus a light railway order under the Light Railways Act 1896 was necessary and was applied for in November 1925. A public inquiry was held by the Light Railway Commissioners in the Assembly Rooms at New Romney on 15 and 16 January 1926. The Minister of Transport indicated his intention to approve the application on 19 February 1926 and the Romney, Hythe and Dymchurch Light Railway Order 1926 (SR&O 1926/741) was made on 26 May. This incorporated the Romney, Hythe and Dymchurch Light Railway Company as a statutory public utility undertaking, gave it powers to construct and work the proposed railway and also included compulsory purchase powers over the land required (which ultimately had to be used to acquire six plots of land on the proposed route).

During construction, the Duke of York (later King George VI) visited the railway on 5 August 1926 and drove Northern Chief, hauling a train with about 100 passengers from Jesson Halt to New Romney and back.

=== Opening ===
The railway was opened on 16 July 1927 by Lord Warden of the Cinque Ports, William Lygon, 7th Earl Beauchamp. The locomotives were designed by Henry Greenly who was commissioned by Howey to work on the construction of the entire railway and became the railway's first chief engineer until his abrupt resignation in March 1929. Mountain Class Hercules hauled the inaugural train from Hythe to New Romney, with guests including the mayors of the two towns and General Sir Ivor Maxse.

Howey was not satisfied with just 8 1/4 miles (13.3 km) of track from Hythe to New Romney and plans were in hand for an extension even before the original section had opened. The line was to be extended 5 1/2 miles (9 km) from New Romney to Dungeness, double-tracked throughout apart from a balloon loop on which the station at Dungeness was sited. A light railway order for this extension was applied for and, following a public inquiry on 18 April 1928, the Romney, Hythe and Dymchurch Light Railway (Extension) Order 1928 (SR&O 1928/613) was granted on 12 July 1928. Ahead of this the line between New Romney and The Pilot had actually opened on 24 May 1928 and the rest of the line through to Dungeness opened on 3 August 1928. Since it was laid directly onto the shingle forming the Dungeness peninsula it has been suggested that the extension was the most cheaply constructed railway in the world.

=== Second World War ===
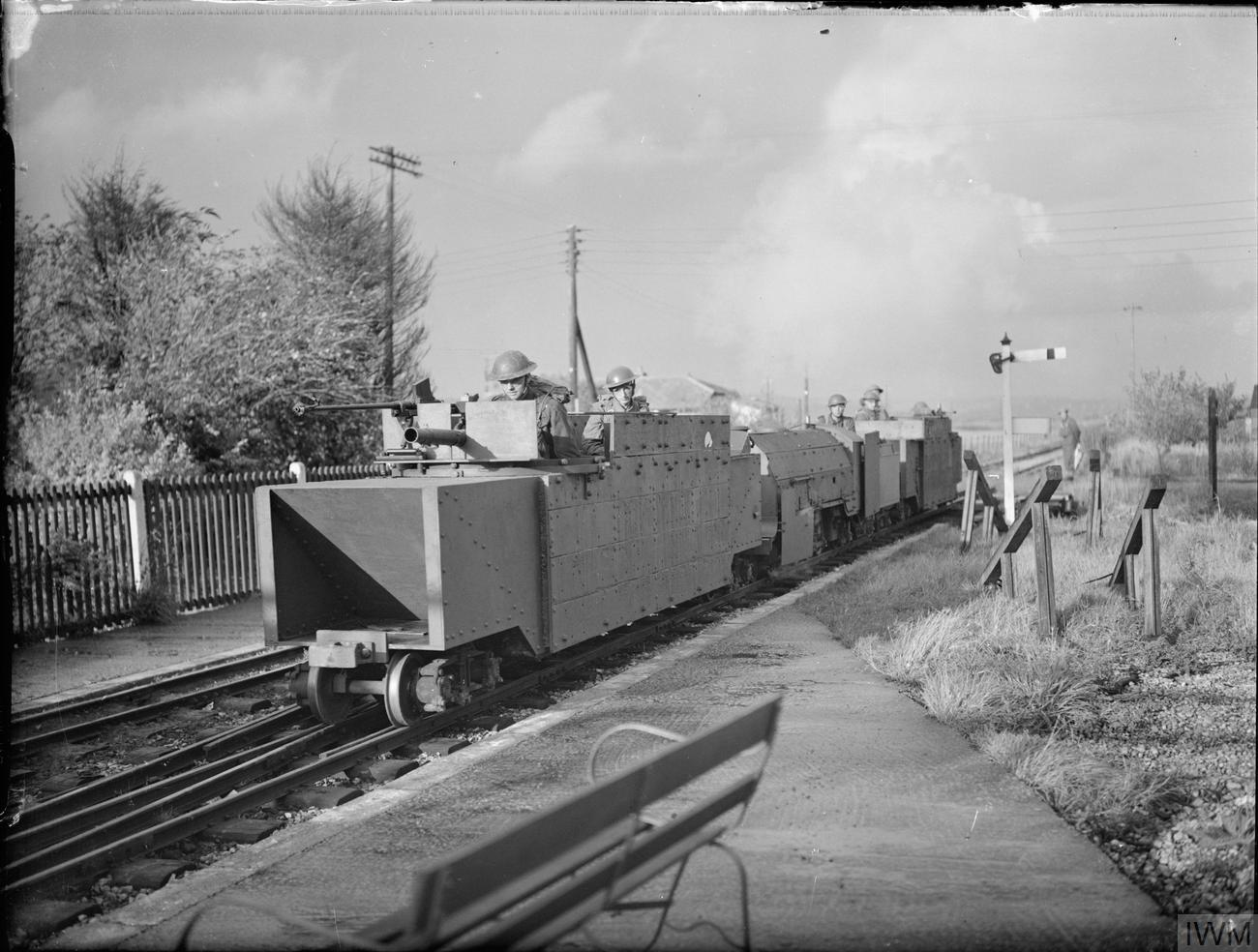
Troops from the Somerset Light Infantry manning the armoured train in October 1940.

In 1940 the railway was taken over by the military during World War II, and a miniature armoured train was used on the line. It was also used by the Department of Petroleum Warfare in the construction of PLUTO ("Pipe Line Under The Ocean") intended to supply fuel to the Allied forces after the D-Day Normandy landings. During the latter stages of the construction of PLUTO considerable damage was caused to the track on the extension when, to speed up the work, lengths of pipe were dragged along the trackbed by bulldozers, resulting in its reduction to a single track after the war.

=== Post war ===
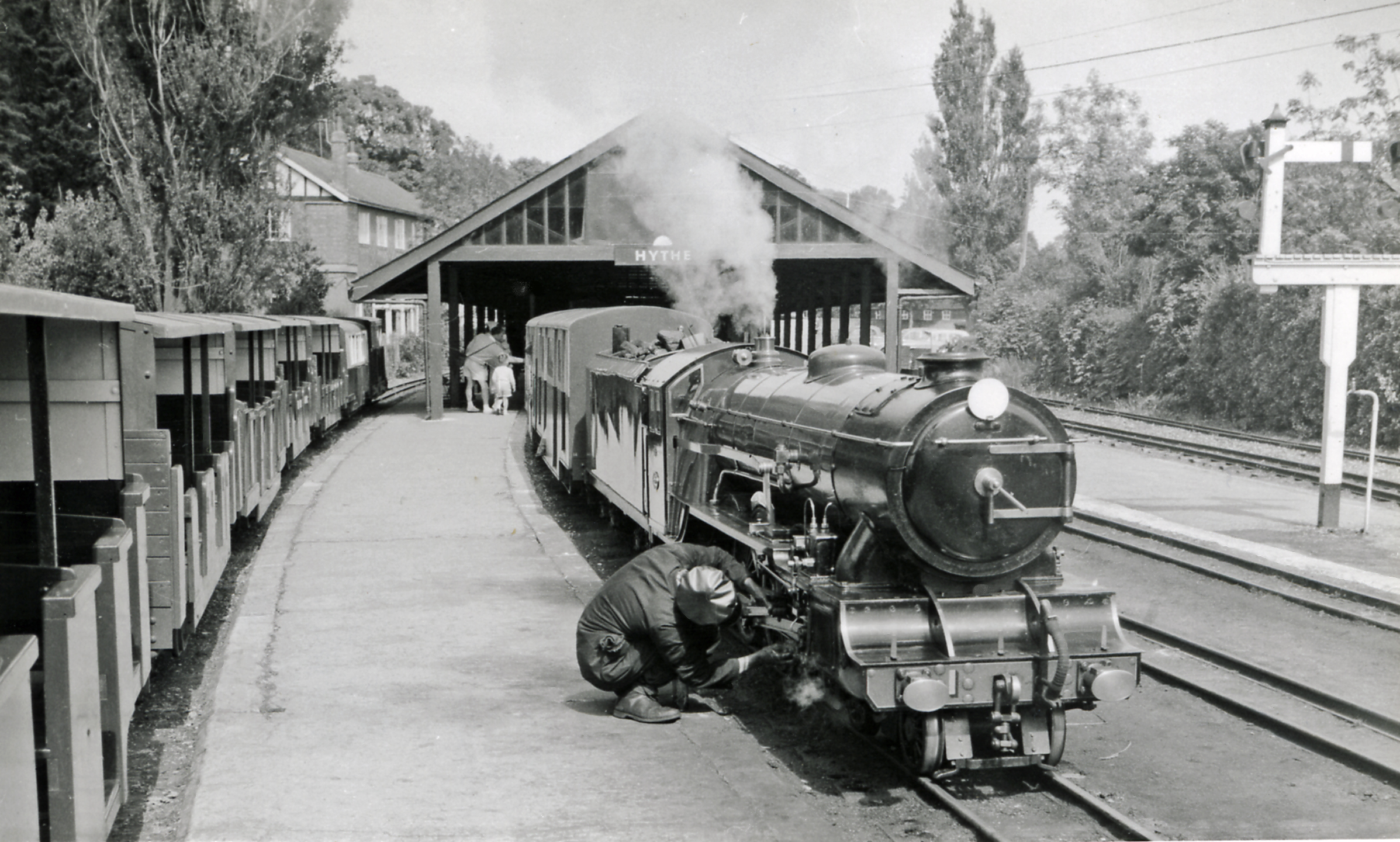
Hythe station with train in 1962

The line re-opened between Hythe and New Romney in 1946, the New Romney to Dungeness section following with a formal opening by Laurel and Hardy on 21 March 1947. Regular services started on 29 March 1947.

In June 1947 the Duke of Westminster's railway from Eaton Hall, Cheshire was transported by the Great Western Railway and Southern Railway from Balderton, Cheshire to New Romney in Kent. It comprised an engine, nine coaches and trucks, and track totalling 222 tons.

In 1949, Captain Howey bought the Duke of Sutherland's private train including engine Dunrobin and 60 feet (18 m) coach for the museum at New Romney. It was transported there in 1950 and displayed until sold in 1963.

From 7 September 1977 until 24 July 2015, the railway provided school trains to transport children to and from the Marsh Academy in New Romney. The service was finally withdrawn due to falling usage.

The railway's role as part of the local public transport network was extended when Warren Halt re-opened in 2009, providing a link to the Romney Marsh Visitor Centre. Further discussions with local councils took place regarding the possible expansion of Burmarsh Road and the provision of a new station at the gravel pits in West Hythe, in connection with both the proposed extensive new housing construction and the need to provide alternative transport to the A259 coast road.

The railway, which carries over 150,000 passengers each year, celebrated its 95th birthday in 2022 with a 2-day steam and diesel gala.

=== Smallest public railway in the world ===
From 1926 to 1978, the RH&DR held the title of the "Smallest public railway in the world" (in terms of track gauge). The title was lost to the 12 1/4 in (311 mm) gauge Réseau Guerlédan in France in 1978 and regained in 1979 when that line closed. It was lost again in 1982 when the 10 1/4 in (260 mm) gauge Wells and Walsingham Light Railway opened.

The railway has featured in several television and radio shows including an episode of the BBC series The Inspector Lynley Mysteries in 2006, Harry Secombe's Highway on 8 September 1991, Michael Bentine's It's a Square World in 1964, BBC's Multicoloured Swapshop (filmed on 20 February 1978) and children's show Rainbow.

=== The Romney, Hythe & Dymchurch Railway Association ===
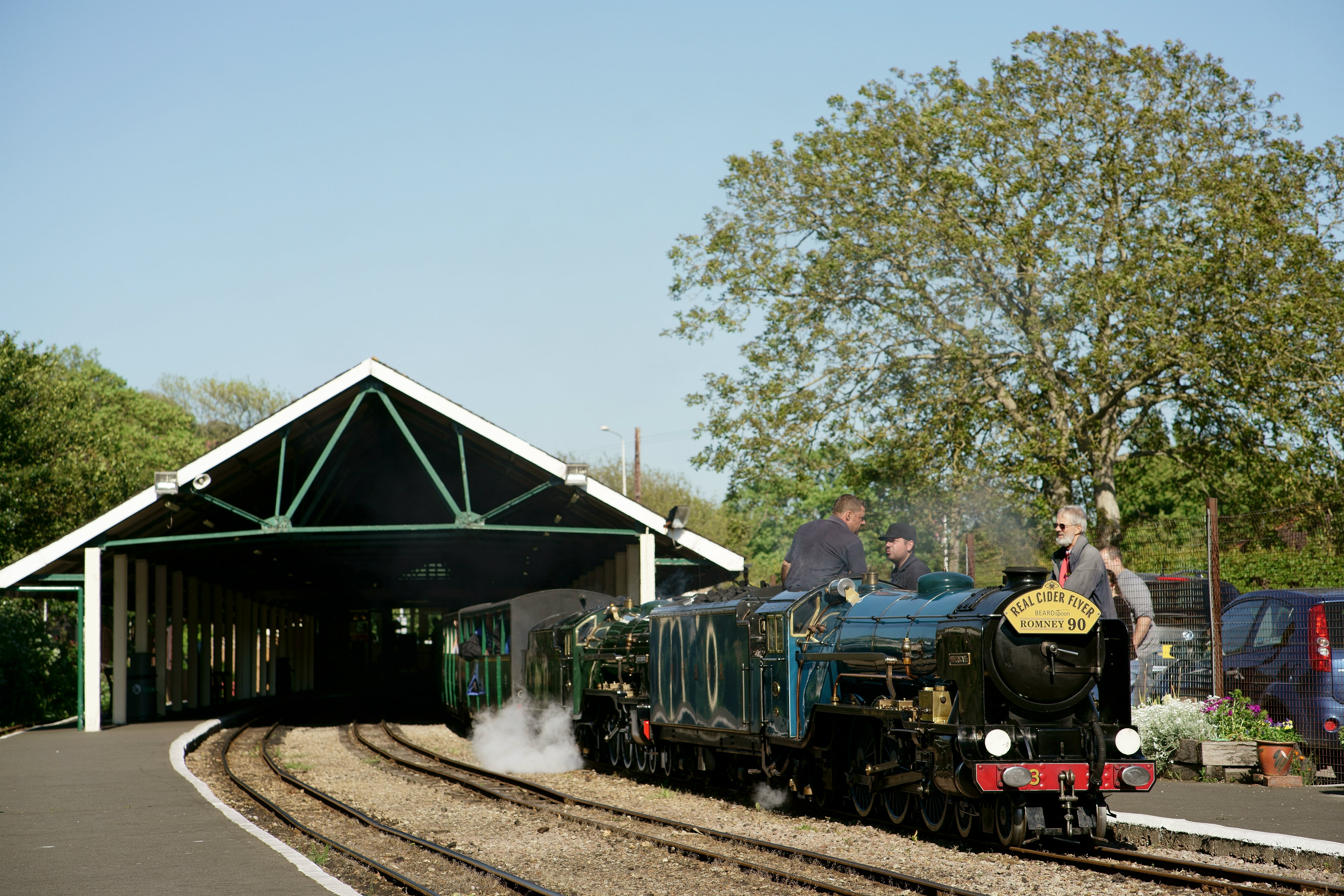
During the May Gala celebrating 90 years. 'Hurricane' and 'Northern Chief' at Hythe.

Formed in 1967 as a supporters association, and regarded with some suspicion by the railway's management of the time, the association has become a significant contributor to the railway's continuance and refurbishment. It is now the largest single shareholder in the railway and its members provide a significant input of voluntary labour on both operating and maintenance work. It became a registered charity on 23 January 2009. At 31 December 2015 its membership stood at 3,355.

== Stations ==
=== Stations currently open ===
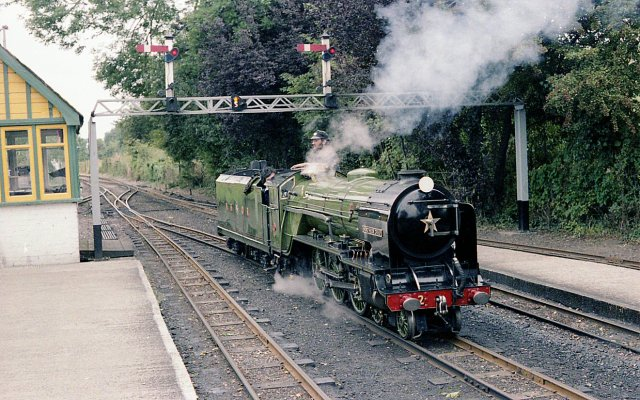
No. 2 Northern Chief awaits the signal at Hythe station.

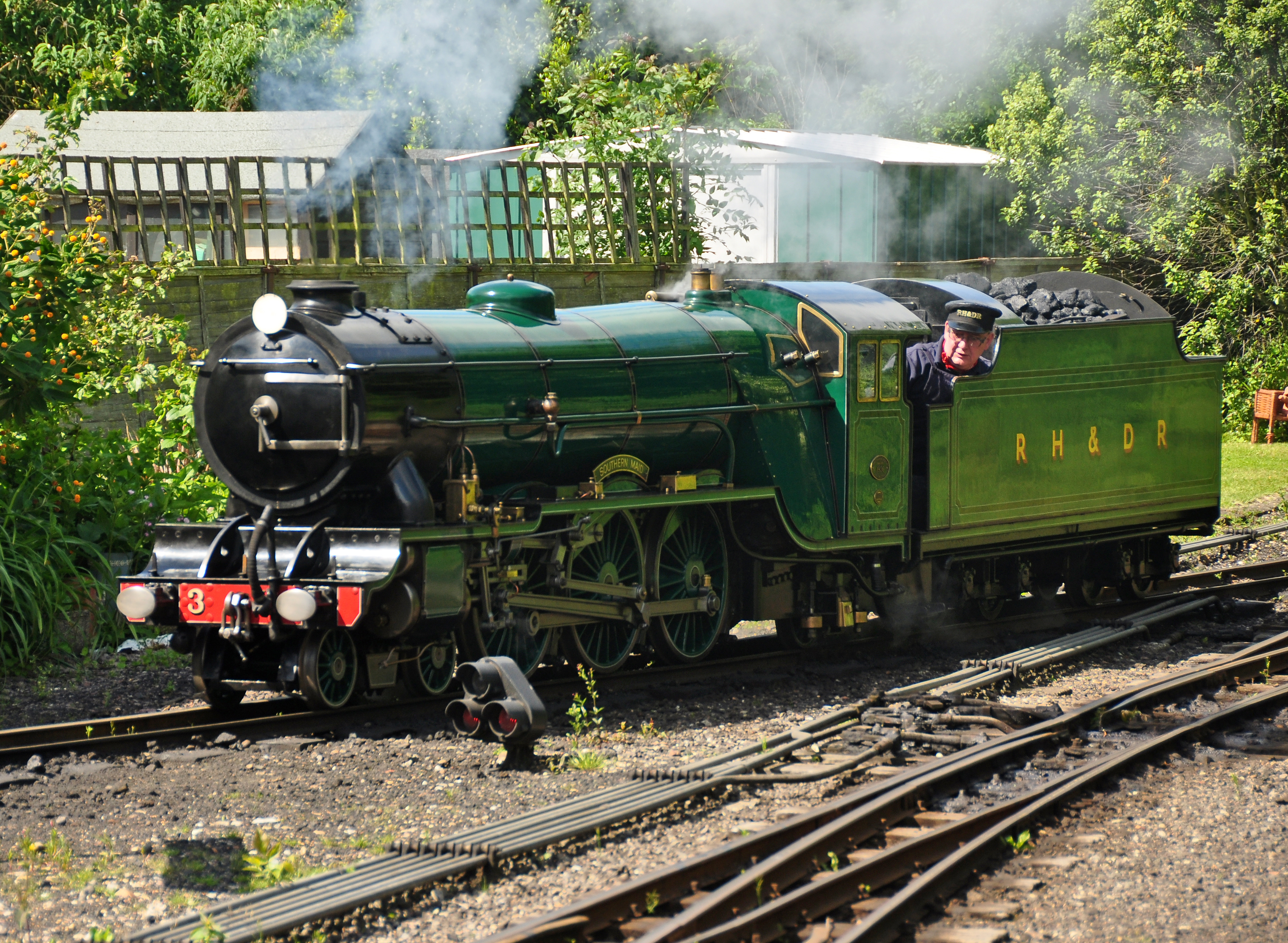
Southern Maid at Hythe station

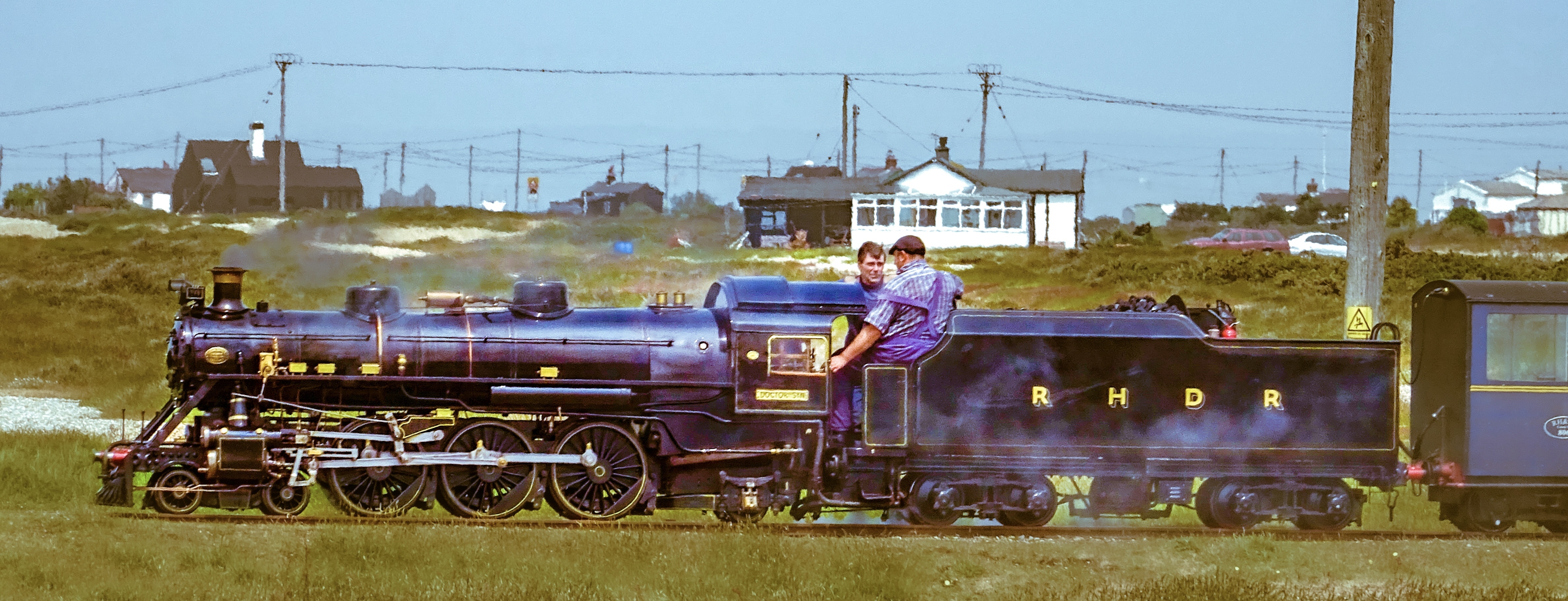
No. 10 Doctor Syn near Dungeness - May 2016

Stations in full or limited use:

- Hythe
- Burmarsh Road (usually special services only)
- Dymchurch
- St Mary's Bay
- Warren Halt (usually visitor centre shuttle trains only)
- New Romney
- Romney Sands
- Dungeness

=== Stations closed ===
Those shown as 'halt' never had a higher status; all stations below became halts prior to their closure.

- Prince of Wales Halt (closed 1928)
- Botolph's Bridge Halt (closed 1939)
- Golden Sands Halt (closed 1990s)
- Greatstone (closed 1983)
- War Department Halt (closed 1945)
- Lade (closed 1983)
- The Pilot Inn (closed 1983)
- Britannia Points Halt (closed 1930)

=== Stations proposed ===
Stations which never existed but were at one time proposed by the directors or are currently under consideration:

- Hythe (Red Lion Square): Was first mentioned at the January 1928 meeting of Hythe Chamber of Commerce by Charles Duruz, a local nurseryman, who had contacted the railway company and who indicated they were quite willing to build this extension. Nothing came of the proposal however. In 1946 the possibility of extending the railway to Red Lion Square, Hythe was investigated again, but the East Kent Road Car Co Ltd agreed to extend their bus service from Folkestone to terminate at the original Hythe station and the extension idea was dropped.
- Sandling Junction: Suggested by objectors to the railway's original light railway order in 1926 as more useful than a terminus on the outskirts of Hythe, but demonstrated by Greenly to be impracticable because of the difference in levels between Hythe and Sandling which would have necessitated severe gradients. The idea was revived in the late 1980s to connect with the main line at Sandling but again came to nothing, although detailed survey work had been undertaken.
- Sandling Park: A proposal was made for a station to serve this estate at Pedlinge on the abortive 1980s Sandling extension.
- Nickolls Quarry: A proposal for a station to serve a new housing development at the West Hythe site of Nickolls Quarry has been formally included in a planning application to Folkestone and Hythe District Council.

== Way and works ==
=== Permanent way ===
The line was originally laid using second-hand First World War surplus rail. Most was 25 lb/yd (12 kg/m) material rolled in the US, the rest was 12 kg/m (25 lb/yd) rolled in Belgium when the country was under German occupation. In the late 1960s and early 1970s the railway managed to obtain supplies of good second-hand 30 lb/yd (15 kg/m) rail on the closure of the Sierra Leone Government Railway; these are the oldest rails on the line, some of which date from the 1890s.

During the mid-1980s the company began obtaining brand new 25 lb/yd rail from Luxembourg before switching to 30 lb/yd material produced British Steel Track Products in Scunthorpe and later obtained further supplies of the same from South Africa. The present standard rail for relaying work is 35 lb/yd (17 kg/m) obtained from a manufacturer in Spain.

The original sleepers were creosoted Baltic fir spaced at 22-inch (560 mm) centres. These have now been entirely replaced by second-hand standard gauge sleepers cut into thirds, creosoted douglas fir, or jarrah and karri (Australian hardwoods from the eucalyptus family).

The railway has a permanent way team, with a full-time staff of platelayers. It forms part of the larger Engineering Department. Some platelayers work all year round, whilst others are diverted to other seasonal employment within the engineering department, for example as summer drivers, when more drivers are required than during the out of season periods. Additionally, the permanent way team is strengthened on many days of the year, especially in the winter months, by volunteer workers.

=== Way and works data ===
The longest underline bridge is Collins Bridge, with a span of approximately 60 feet (18 m). The summit of the line is 20 ft (6.1 m) above Ordnance Datum, located between Hull Road and Taylor Road, Lydd-on–Sea. The ruling gradient is 1 in 75 at the Dungeness end of New Romney Station rising from the Littlestone Road Tunnels. The tightest curve measures 6.8 chains (450 ft; 140 m) radius and is at the Hythe end of 'The Deviation', a dogleg section of track at Pennypot on the outskirts of Hythe.

The ruling gradient and tightest curve are the results of post-1972 reconstruction work. Pre-1990 references to these give out-of-date figures. Statements in a number of books claiming the summit of the line is at Star Dyke (a point approximately midway between Burmarsh Road level crossing and Willop Sewer) are only partly correct; whilst it is the highest point between Hythe and New Romney it is not the highest on the entire line.

== Signalling ==
=== Signal boxes ===
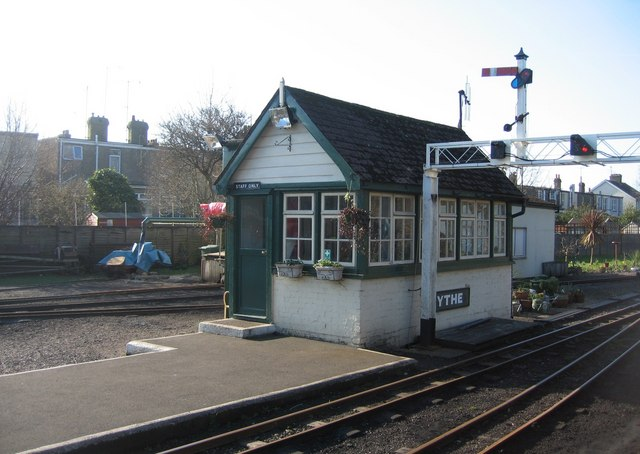
Hythe Signal Box

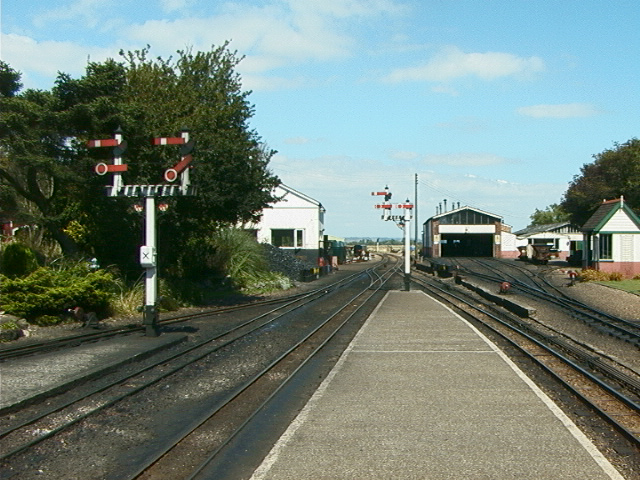
New Romney station view north from the platform with signals and engine sheds.

There were originally six signal boxes on the first section of the line to open (Hythe to New Romney). All were equipped with Greenly designed fully interlocked lever frames constructed by Jackson Rigby Ltd at New Romney. These were:

Hythe - 16 levers controlling points and signals within the station area. Now the only original Jackson Rigby lever frame in existence.

Palmarsh - although this building is known to have existed there is doubt about whether the 8 lever Jackson Rigby frame it contained was ever fully connected up. The frame was later transferred to Greatstone (see below). The box itself had vanished by the late-1940s.

Burmarsh Road - 2 levers located in the booking office and controlling signals. The station building had vanished by the mid-1950s.

Dymchurch - confusion surrounds the number of levers in this box, with different sources quoting 10, 12 and 16. The box had vanished by 1963 and signalling is controlled here today by a push button electronic panel in the booking office and a 2 lever ground frame released by an Annett's key normally held in the signal panel.

Holiday Camp – this building is known to have been erected on land owned by Allnatt Ltd since it is marked on the plans accompanying a combined conveyance/lease concluded by the railway with that company and is shown as measuring 12 by 6 ft (3.7 by 1.8 m). Some rather poor quality photographic evidence of the existence of this box also exists. There is uncertainty as to whether it was ever brought into use though and if so how many levers it contained.

New Romney – 17 levers controlling points and signals within the station area. The lever frame was enlarged to the present 24 levers when the line was extended to Dungeness in 1928.

The extension to Dungeness led to the enlargement of the lever frame at New Romney (as mentioned above) and also the opening of two new signal boxes:

Greatstone - the 8 lever frame originally at Palmarsh was transferred here and installed in the booking office.

Dungeness - like Dymchurch it is uncertain how many levers this box actually contained.

Arrangements for working the temporary turning wye at The Pilot are not known.

== Locomotives ==
=== Locomotives in service ===
Including engines serviceable, under overhaul, awaiting overhaul, or reserved to shunting or engineering duties.

No	Name	Picture	Livery	Locomotive type	Wheel arrangement	Builder	Year built	Whistle
1	Green Goddess	Green Goddess	LNER Apple Green	Steam	4-6-2	Davey Paxman & Co.	1925	Small Chime
2	Northern Chief	Northern Chief	Brunswick Green	Steam	4-6-2	Davey Paxman & Co.	1925	Bulleid
3	Southern Maid	Southern Maid	SE&CR Green	Steam	4-6-2	Davey Paxman & Co.	1926	ex-Isle of Wight Hooter
4	The Bug	The Bug	Improved Engine Green	Steam	0-4-0T+T	Krauss, Munich	1926	RH&DR
5	Hercules	Hercules	Midland Railway Maroon	Steam	4-8-2	Davey Paxman & Co.	1927	GWR Hall
6	Samson	Samson	Prussian Blue	Steam	4-8-2	Davey Paxman & Co.	1927	US Crosby
7	Typhoon	TyphoonNR	Southern Railway Malachite Green	Steam	4-6-2	Davey Paxman & Co.	1927	BR Crosby
8	Hurricane	Hurricane	Caledonian Railway Blue	Steam	4-6-2	Davey Paxman & Co.	1927	Chrome LNER A4
9	Winston Churchill	Winston Churchill	Maroon with yellow lining	Steam	4-6-2	Yorkshire Engine Company	1931	Crosby
10	Dr Syn	Dr Syn	Black with Yellow lining	Steam	4-6-2	Yorkshire Engine Company	1931	LNER A4 from 4491 'Commonwealth of Australia'
11	Black Prince	Black Prince	DB Black/Red	Steam	4-6-2	Krupp, Essen	1937	Fowler
12	J.B. Snell	John Southland	Black/Yellow	Diesel-Mechanical	Bo-Bo	TMA Engineering	1983	2-Tone Horn (AirChime, Ltd)
14	Captain Howey	Captain Howey	Blue/Silver	Diesel-Mechanical	Bo-Bo	TMA Engineering	1989	2-Tone Horn (AirChime, Ltd)
15	Shelagh of Eskdale On loan from Ravenglass and Eskdale Railway	Shelagh of Eskdale	Two-Tone Green	Diesel-Mechanical	4-6-4	Severn Lamb	1969	
PW1	Simplex		Green	Diesel-Mechanical	4wdDM	Motor Rail Ltd. (Simplex Wks)	1938	None
PW2	Scooter		WD Grey	Petrol-Mechanical	0-4-0PM	RH&DR	1949	Ex Fire Engine
PW3	Red Gauntlet		Red	Petrol-Mechanical	0-4-0PM	Jacot / Keef	1964 / 1975	Halfords

=== Locomotive names ===
- Nameplates are usually in upper case.
- No 1 was named Green Goddess after the 1921 stage play by William Archer, which Captain Howey had enjoyed.
- Nos 2 & 3 were to be called Northern Chief and Southern Chief and these nameplates were fitted at the works; however No 3's name was changed to Southern Maid.
- No 4 was sold in 1934 after construction because the proposed shunting and freight trains for it to work did not materialise. It ran in Belle Vue, Manchester, then Belfast with the new name Jean. The engine regained its original name on return to the RH&DR and restoration in the 1970s. It bears the colloquial name Basil the Bug in its role as mascot of the railway's children's supporter group.
- Nos 5 & 6 were to be called Man of Kent and Maid of Kent, but due to their high tractive effort (having smaller coupled wheels than the Pacifics) the names Hercules and Samson, with their allusion of strength, were substituted during construction. A decade later, Henry Greenly, the designer, was involved in the construction of a locomotive on the nearby Saltwood Miniature Railway, and this engine took the Maid of Kent name.
- Nos 7 & 8 were constructed with an extra third cylinder for express passenger services and were given their names Typhoon and Hurricane for speed. The third cylinder was later removed from each due to unreliability. The locomotives were originally to carry the Samson and Hercules nameplates, but Howey gave the Mountain classes these names before the three-cylinder locomotives had arrived.
- Following a mishap when Howey was at the controls, No 8 was renamed Bluebottle between 1938 and 1946, apparently as a punishment.
- No 9 was originally Black Prince, but exchanged its name with No 10 in 1931. Its name became Winston Churchill in 1948 for a tour of Canada, and remained so afterwards. At the same time the name Doctor Syn was transferred to No 10 and the name Black Prince fell into disuse.
- A brass name plate survives suggesting one of the Canadian outline locos was originally to have been called Black Devil. In the event this name was never used. George Barlow, the railway's operating manager, received a brass rubbing of this from an enquirer. When offered up to the cab side of Doctor Syn the bolt holes on the rubbing matched those in the loco's cab side perfectly.
- No 11 took over the redundant Black Prince name upon transfer to the RH&DR in 1976, in place of its German name Fleißiges Lieschen (Busy Lizzie). The name was chosen after a competition run by a local newspaper in which Spitfire scored heavily, but was considered rather undiplomatic given the loco's origins.
- No 12, originally named John Southland after the founder of the local secondary school in New Romney, has since been renamed after the railway's long serving managing director John Bernard Snell.
- No 13 was never assigned, probably due to superstition. Another engine of the same class as Nos 12 and 14 was built in the years between them (1988) and exported to the Shuzenji Romney Railway in Japan where it is No 3 in their fleet and carries the name John Southland II.
- No 14 ran nameless for 12 years until it was named after the line's founder, Captain Howey.
- PW1 carried the fleet number 4 for about ten years from 1961 as a replacement for the Rolls-Royce engine, which in turn had inherited the number from The Bug which had been sold. The engine was renumbered PW1 shortly before the return of The Bug, leaving fleet number 4 available again for its original holder.
- PW2 was constructed in 1949, mainly by the rebuilding and re-use of a former War Department locomotive which had been in service since 1929. Popularly known as The Scooter it has recently acquired nameplates showing this name.
- PW3 Redgauntlet was built c1964 by Michel Jacot and using a modified Austin 7 engine originally ran on paraffin. It ran trials at both the Ravenglass & Eskdale and Romney, Hythe and Dymchurch in the late 1960s and was acquired by the RHDR in the early 1970s.

=== Locomotives withdrawn from service ===
This list includes engines sold, scrapped, failed in trials, or otherwise withdrawn. All engines were internal combustion locomotives.

Name or designation	Wheel arrangement	Builder	Year built	Year withdrawn	Notes
Super-Scooter (JAP Scooter)	Ultra-light 4-wheel scooter	RH&DR			Was made by putting a two cylinder engine on a wagon chassis
War Department Locomotive	4-wheel scooter	War Department	1929	1949	The only privately owned locomotive to have seen long-term service on the RH&DR. Stabled at Hythe engine shed, worked the War Department branch line. Remained in RH&DR service briefly after the branch line closed. Used extensively as the basis for construction of locomotive PW2.
Rolls-Royce Locomotive	Bo′2'	RH&DR		1961	
Firefly	0-6-0	HCS Bullock (rebuilt RH&DR)	1936 (rebuilt 1945)	1947	Although a 10 1/4 in (260 mm)gauge engine, Firefly was liveried and lettered as a RH&DR locomotive, and operated the post-war shuttle service when part of the line from New Romney to Warren Halt was temporarily re-gauged to 10 1/4 in (260 mm) gauge. From 1947 the engine formed part of Howey's alternative project which became the Hastings Miniature Railway.
Royal Anchor	B-B	Charles Lane of Liphook	1956	1956	Diesel Hydraulic double-ended (two cabs) locomotive, built for RH&DR service (as the Rolls-Royce locomotive was near withdrawal). Royal Anchor failed trials due to lack of power. The project was abandoned and the locomotive returned to Liphook. It operated on the R&ER 1960–1977, and then at Carnforth 1977–2000. It is now operating privately in the USA.

=== Locomotives on site ===
In addition to the railway's own 16 locomotives, one additional engine is currently housed at New Romney. This is a partially constructed third-scale reproduction of an LMS Princess Coronation Class locomotive, commonly known as the 'Duchess' type (although of the 38 engines of this class, only 10 were named after duchesses). The replica was commissioned by Paul Riley, a director of the railway, as a private project and is currently stored in an engineers' depot. Following the unexpected death of Mr Riley on 4 June 2008 the future of this locomotive is currently unknown. It is understood that the machine is more than half complete. This Locomotive was removed from the railway earlier this year and is currently (Summer 2023) up for sale with the Denver Light Railway.

== Freight traffic ==
=== Freight services ===
From the outset, the railway's owners and designers envisaged freight services. Two of the original locomotives (No 5 Hercules and No 6 Samson) were built to the 'mountain' wheel arrangement (4-8-2), unique on any British railway and giving the ability to haul heavy freight with only a small loss of speed when used on passenger work. In the early years the railway carried a limited amount of freight (mainly shingle and fish traffic). A goods shed was built at New Romney and featured dual gauge track allowing easy transfer between the standard and 15-inch gauges. This was seldom used and was demolished in about 1934.

The greater part of the railway's freight traffic in the early years was carried for the War Department, who made extensive use of the line to convey materials and equipment for the construction of the reinforced concrete sound ranging detectors they were experimenting with near Greatstone. A special siding was laid in joining their working site with the RHDR main line (the course of which can still be traced today [2016]) and the WD constructed their own locomotive to work their trains.

From time to time, the railway has had short term ad hoc freight contracts, for example one in 1975 to transport drainage pipes. The most recent freight workings involved delivering gas mains from New Romney to Greatstone in 1989. As a publicity stunt the first gas main train was steam hauled using No 4 The Bug, which appeared on the local TV news that evening.

The railway operates its own engineering and permanent way trains, which now form the majority of its non-passenger workings.

==== Dungeness fish trade ====
There are several disused sidings on the beach at Dungeness. These were used by fishermen to help move their hauls across the shingle. This joint provision was to allow transport of fish from Dungeness to Hythe and there to transfer it to road. The company had four-wheel fish wagons, stencilled "Fish Only". The service was developed from 1937 following closure of the South Eastern Railway's Dungeness line that year. The fish trade developed in a small way and was withdrawn. Two such sidings are still in place but are both in a very poor state of repair although they were used by fishermen to transport fish across the beach for many years after the main railway service was withdrawn.

To facilitate the transfer of this traffic from rail to road on its arrival at Hythe the track serving Platform 1 there extended into the car park for some years.

==== Uncrushed shingle transport ====
The most successful freight service was the uncrushed ballast service. Following withdrawal of War Department operations over their siding near Maddieson's Camp, the railway utilised the infrastructure to operate ballast trains. In 1937 a subsidiary ballast company was formed. Tipper wagons (skips) were loaded with shingle and transported along the branch line and then up the main line to Hythe, often lying over in the sidings at Dymchurch to prevent delay to passenger trains using the same tracks. At Hythe the wagons were originally pushed by the locomotive up a concrete ramp and the wagons tipped into a large concrete holding bin or directly into waiting lorries, a precarious practice which was later replaced by mechanical haulage up the ramp. After the war the Hythe workings were cut back and the wagons were unloaded in a siding (in what is now New Romney station car park), the remnant of which is now used for loading coal into loco tenders. This practice did not last long and a purpose built siding and ramp was installed south of New Romney on the Dungeness line. The fence line can still be seen. In 1951, after 14 years, the subsidiary company switched to entirely road transport and the company closed the branch and the freight incline. At Hythe, the concrete pillars were still visible until the early 1980s when they were demolished to allow access to the car park extension along the former platform 4 and engine release siding.

==== Postal service ====
The railway is licensed by the Post Office for rail postal services, and is entitled to issue postage stamps. A number of first day covers have been issued. A four-wheel secure postage wagon was constructed.

==== Parcels service ====
The railway operates a casual parcels service. Parcels handed in at one station will be delivered to another for collection. This is the last remnant of the railway's freight services.

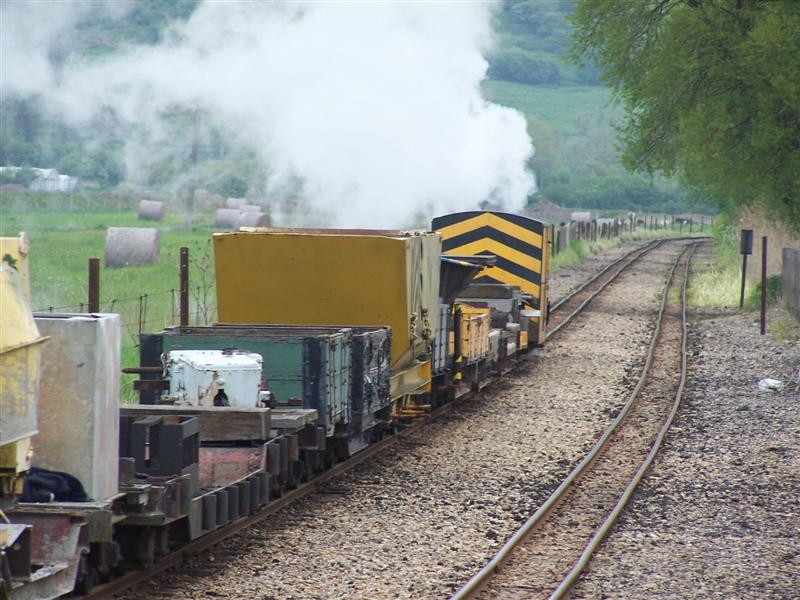
Some of the freight wagons behind No 2

=== Freight vehicles ===
The railway has permanent way stock, examples of which include:

- the platelayers' mess coach 100P
- assorted tipper wagons (largely left over from ballast operations)
- secure tool trucks
- specialized platelaying vehicles incorporating concrete mixers, compressors, generators etc.
- flat wagons
- four-wheel wagons, both box vans and open trucks, including vehicles surviving from the fish trains
- tank wagons, used primarily for spraying weed killer on tracks.

== Passenger traffic ==
=== Passenger services ===
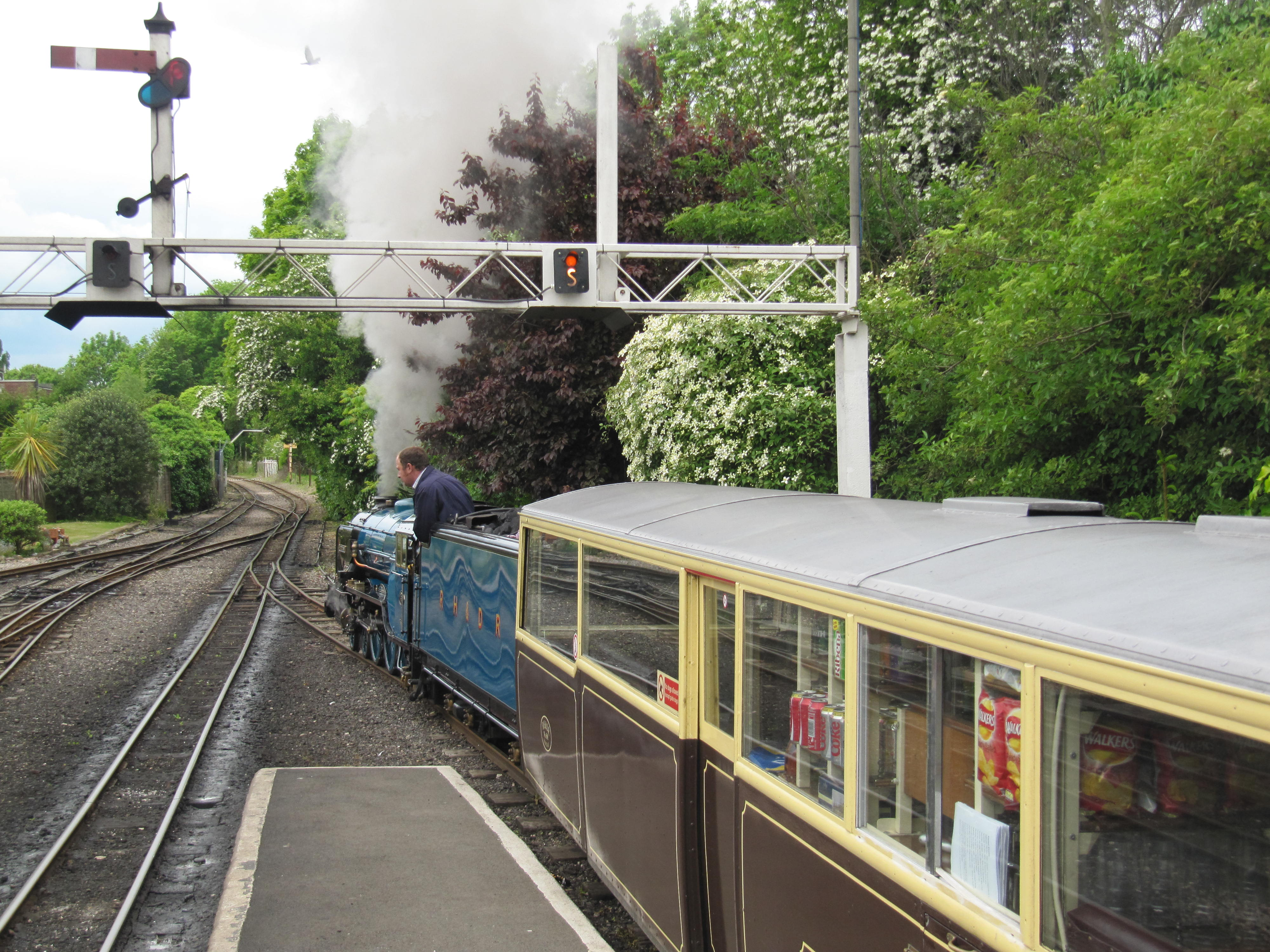
The Romney, Hythe and Dymchurch Railway No 8 Hurricane

The railway was conceived and constructed as a public service, not as a tourist attraction, although it now relies on tourist trade.

School children were transported under contract to Kent County Council to The Marsh Academy (known as Southland's Comprehensive School until 2007); this service was provided all year during term time. The contract ceased due to falling passenger numbers after the summer term in July 2015. Local residents are transported to shopping centres and the railway has operated 'shoppers specials'. Holiday camp trains have operated with camps at Romney Sands, St Mary's Bay and Dymchurch. Charters are operated as required. During the Second World War the railway was operated by The Royal Engineers and later the Somerset Light Infantry as a military railway and there was extensive transport of soldiers on troop trains.

=== Passenger vehicles ===
At the outset the railway was equipped with four-wheeled 8-seater coaches designed by Henry Greenly and his son Kenneth. 117 of these had been built by 1928. With only half height doors and no glazing except in the end bulkheads these were totally unsuitable for winter operation, especially to Dungeness. In 1928 the railway took delivery of eight fully enclosed 12-seat bogie coaches built by the Clayton Carriage & Wagon Company of Lincoln which incorporated electric lighting and steam heating.

In 1934 Howey decided to scrap all the original four-wheelers and replace them with fully enclosed bogie vehicles. The 16-foot underframes for these were constructed by Robert Hudson Ltd of Leeds and the bodies were built locally by the Hythe Cabinet & Joinery Works Ltd. By June 1936 54 of these together with two matching vans had been taken into stock.

The RH&DR now operates 20-seat and 16-seat open and closed coaches. These have been built on four different types of underframe:

- The original Clayton Carriage & Wagon Co 20 ft 3 in (6.17 m) long frames unaltered in length (used for 16-seat opens and 8-seat guards vans)
- The 1936 16 ft (4.88 m) Robert Hudson frames extended to between 23 ft 3 in (7.09 m) and 23 ft 9 in (7.24 m) by inserting a new centre section between the swan-necks which carry the frame over the bogies (used for 20-seat open and closed coaches)
- A small batch of all welded 19 ft 9 in (6.02 m) long frames made by Gowers of Bedford in 1962 and unaltered in length (used for 16-seat closed coaches)
- The remaining bogie hopper wagons acquired secondhand from the Ravenglass and Eskdale Railway in 1928 (used for 20-seater semi-open coaches)

The first batch of 20-seater closed coaches were bodied with utile and numbered 51 to 61 inclusive. From coach 62 onwards aluminium has been used.

Over 80 years, the coach livery has changed from all-over green to brown and cream, blue, blue and cream, green and cream, chocolate and cream, and red and cream in the late 1980s. Since 2000, rakes of coaches (trains of around a dozen coaches) have been painted in individual liveries and there are now maroon, green, blue, crimson and teak coaches; 'Heritage' coaches are chocolate and cream.

The railway has built several coaches to accommodate wheelchair users, starting with driving trailer coach 105 (heavily re-built after extensive accident damage in 1993 and later named Marjorie) followed by 601 Elsie, then 602 Winn and 603 May.

A new coach design featuring a lower floor, for easier loading, and a higher roof-line, giving better headroom for wheelchair users, was introduced in 2015. The first, Phylis, is painted lined brown and normally runs with the teak coaches. Two further coaches, Iris for the green set and Edith May for the teak/chocolate set, are under construction and will carry batteries in a compartment over one end bogie for coach lighting. As well as the wheelchair compartment, which has tip-up seats, each will have a guard's compartment with (emergency) brake valve, vacuum gauge, side ducket lookouts and a standard seating compartment. The guard's compartment has four seats and may be used by passengers when not in use by the guard

In addition to the main stock, the 'Heritage' set is made up of:

- the Clayton Pullman (built in 1928 and the last remaining example of a set of eight, with superior comfort and design with twelve seats in three compartments, originally with steam heating and coach lighting);
- a preserved 1960s twelve-seat hardboard bodied coach named Ruth;
- the Royal Saloon (used by Queen Elizabeth II and members of her family when she visited the railway on 30 March 1957), a luxury version of a coach design introduced in 1934/5;
- and the licensed bar car named Gladys (after Captain Howey's wife), an observation coach built on a 1936 Robert Hudson underframe extended to 32 ft (9.75 m) with a bar and 16 seats.

== Armoured train ==
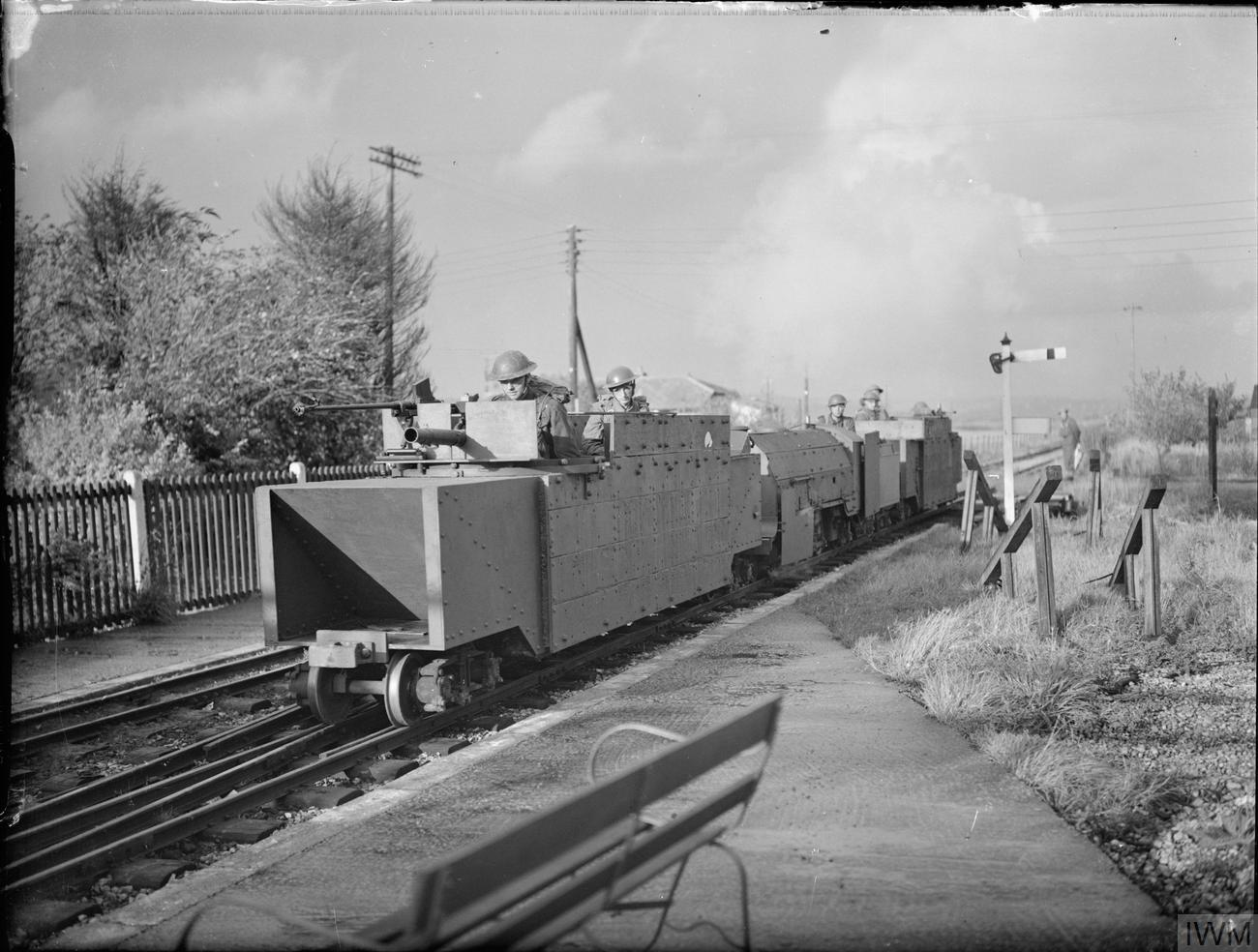
Romney, Hythe and Dymchurch Railway armoured train, October 1940

During World War II, a miniature armoured train was used on the line to patrol the coast in case of invasion. The train consisted of No 5 Hercules and a few wagons fitted with armour plating and armed with a Boys anti-tank rifle and Lewis guns.

== Proposed extension to Sandling ==
Objectors to the railway's first light railway order advocated an extension from Hythe to Sandling (2 miles (3.2 km) away) to meet mainline services at Sandling Junction which they claimed would provide a more useful transport facility than the original proposals. Henry Greenly undertook a preliminary survey which demonstrated the scheme was impracticable.

Supposition that the 4-8-2 locomotives Hercules and Samson were ordered for the project, which involved steep inclines, is unfounded as the engines were intended for freight traffic, in particular a contract with Kent County Council to transport up to 30,000 tons of ballast a year from their pits at Palmarsh. In the end this contract failed to materialize.

In the 1980s, the directors reconsidered proposals to extend the line to Sandling and detailed surveys were undertaken. Again, consideration was given to motive power with new locomotives discussed. Although still called the "Sandling Extension", the 1980s plan was for a single-track line from Pennypot, 300 yards (270 m) short of Hythe, to provide a more gentle route to an area known as The Roughs, where a more powerful locomotive would take over for the heavy climb to Sandling station. It would therefore have been a branch line rather than an actual extension to the existing mainline. Again, the project was abandoned mainly because of the same obstacles as before.

== Tenders ==
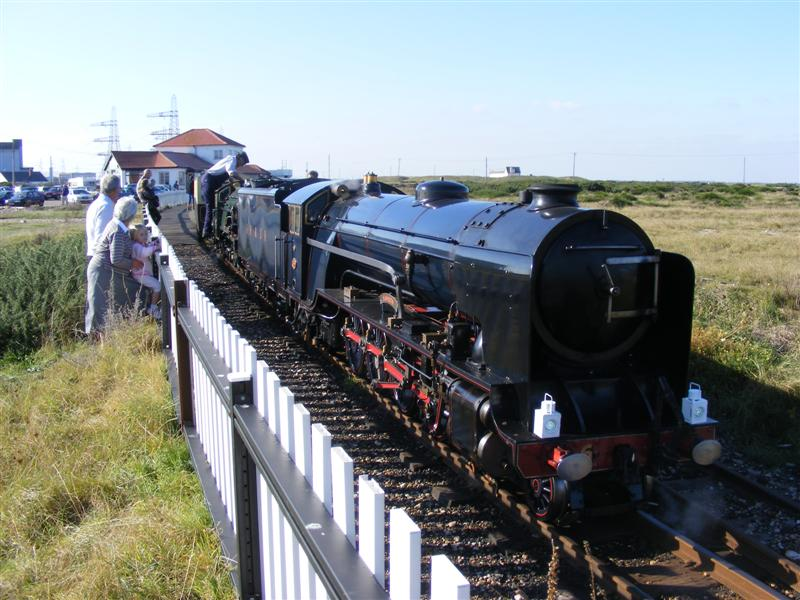
The tender from Hurricane behind Samson at Dungeness

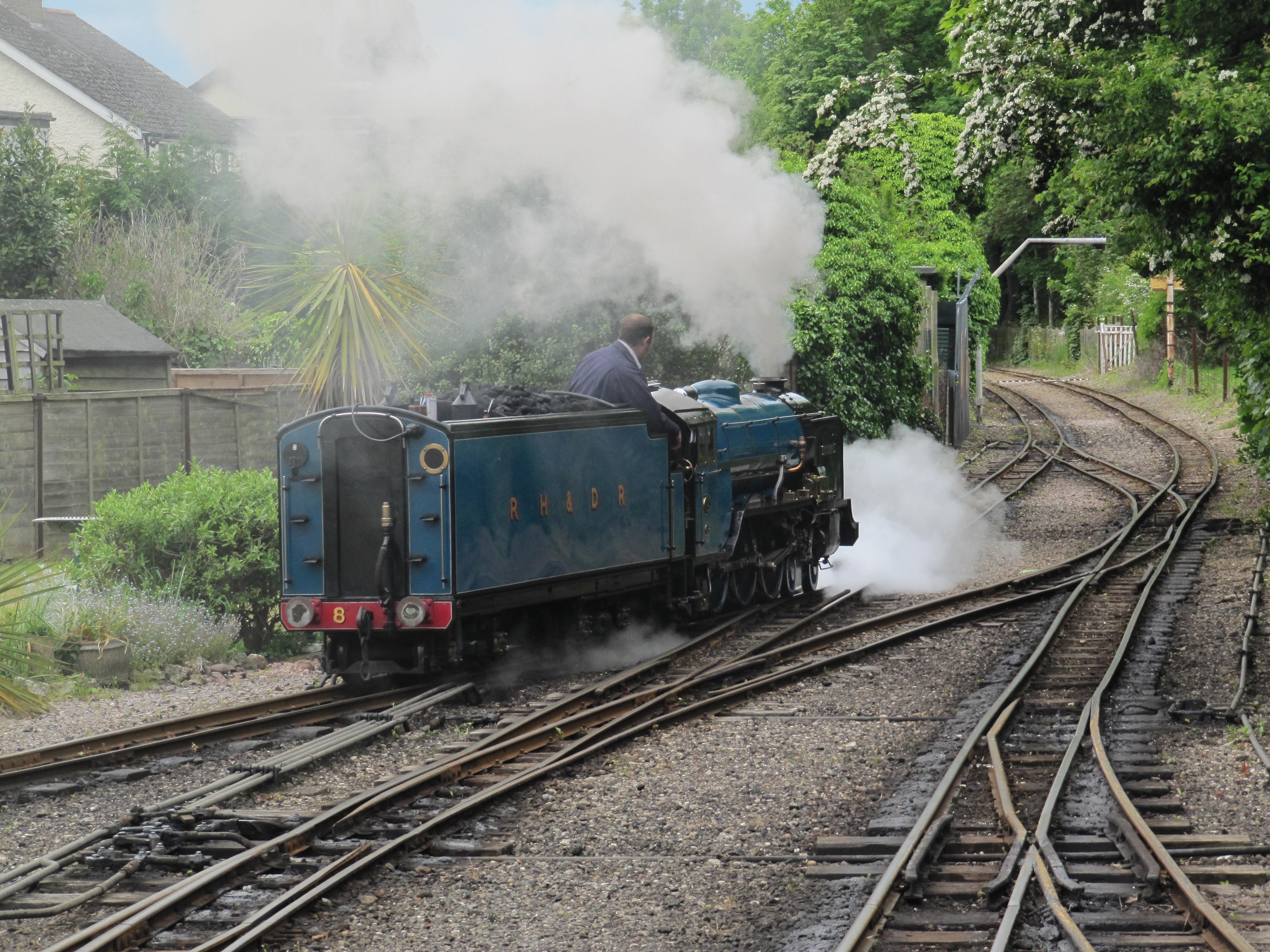
The mock corridor tender behind Hurricane

The following tenders are in use:

- Green Goddess (rebodied in 2009) and Typhoon (rebodied in 2012) have Ashford 1947 tenders (see below).
- Northern Chief and Southern Maid ran with 1983–4 built TMA tenders which are similar to, but longer than, the Greenly tenders and have a greater coal and water capacity. Northern Chief received a new tender tank as part of her overhaul in the winter of 2015. "Southern Maid" will return to traffic in 2016 with a new tender tank which will be a copy of her old tank.
- The Bug's tender was newly built in the mid-1970s as the original had been cut up during its time in a Belfast scrap yard. A new tender tank was built by Fowler Engineering and fitted in October 2022
- Hercules and Samson have, since 2009, been fitted with new tenders to a design resembling the Great Northern Railway 'high-sided' type.
- Hurricane is coupled to the rebodied Paxman-built 1934 large tender, complete with mock corridor connector (a feature of LNER locos used on the non-stop London–Edinburgh services allowing for crew changes en route).
- Winston Churchill and Doctor Syn have rebodied Gower tenders using parts from their original Vanderbilt tenders from 1931.
- Black Prince received a new tender in 2008, using bogies and other parts from its original one which, like the Greenly tenders, suffered from low water and coal capacity. As built, the loco and tender were fitted with air brakes which were replaced at the RH&DR with vacuum brakes for the loco driving wheels only; the original tender was not altered. The new tender, fitted with vacuum brakes, was tested at New Romney on 27 September 2008. On 4 October 2008, Black Prince completed a 28-mile (45 km) non-stop run from Hythe to Dungeness and back again, without the aid of another tender, a first for this locomotive.

=== Greenly tenders ===
Of the seven Greenly tenders supplied new with locos 1–8, two are still in service albeit with new bodies to the original design. Originally built with vacuum brakes and a handbrake, both brake systems have been removed, leaving them as through-piped only. They were coupled to Hercules and Samson but withdrawn from mainline service due to concerns over safety, and their coal and water capacity.

=== Ashford tenders ===
The Southern Railway's Ashford works built four tenders in 1946–47. Ashford No 1 ran coupled to Hercules, but was built too high because John Iron, the Southern's draughtsman sent to New Romney to "measure a loco", took his measurements from a Canadian-type Pacific and not a British outline one. The design of subsequent tenders was altered hurriedly after this and the second one, Ashford No 2, was coupled to Typhoon. The design was further refined and two more were constructed. Ashford No 3 was coupled to Green Goddess and Ashford No 4 to Southern Maid. Ashford No 1 last ran in 1974 when Hercules was withdrawn for overhaul. Ashford Nos 2 and 3 are still in service with new bodies. Ashford No 4 was withdrawn when Southern Maid was overhauled in 1983.

Until 1959, when its tender was cut down in size, Hercules ran with the cab roof raised on blocks of wood to match the height of the tender.

=== Tender shortage ===
Hercules was out of service after the Burmarsh Road level crossing incident in 2003, and Samson was withdrawn from service for an intermediate overhaul shortly afterwards. Once both locomotives were back in service, the railway was faced with a tender shortage. Samson was kept from mainline service while Hercules was coupled to the tender from Green Goddess while it was stored prior to overhaul. During the 2007 season, Samson saw service using the tender from Hurricane while it was being overhauled (a situation that had also happened in 1949 when Samson was used for ballast train duties).

== Safety ==
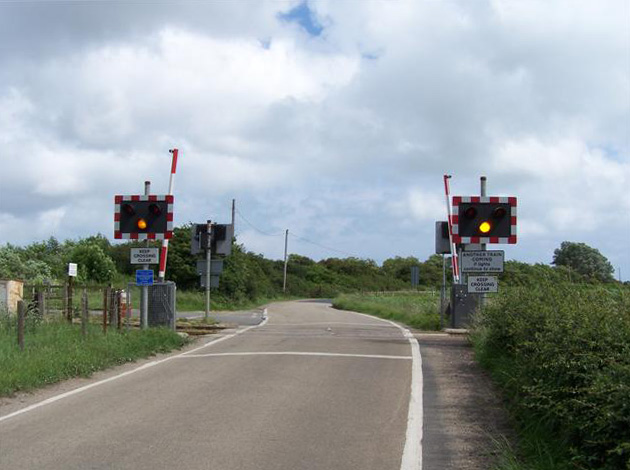
The level crossing at Botolph's Bridge was the first to be converted to an ABCL.

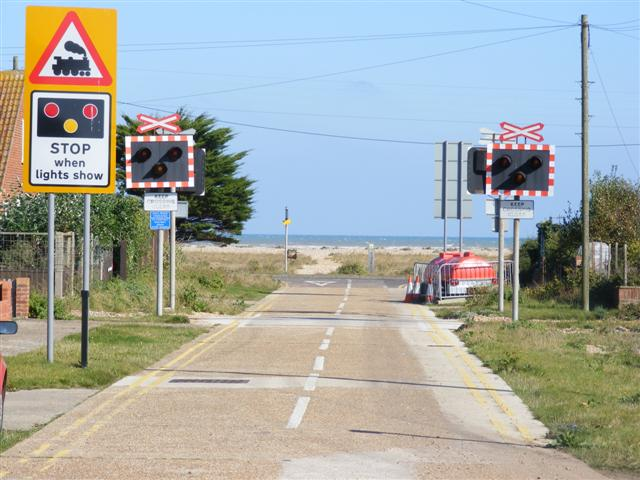
Hull Road level crossing just south of Romney Sands before barriers were fitted

=== Incidents ===
There have been a number of serious accidents over the railway's 90-year operation with an extensive mainline timetable. The majority of these have been related to level crossings, and in every documented case the road user has either admitted liability, or been found to have been in the wrong by the subsequent investigation. Despite the presence of large numbers of visitors and tourists, almost all recorded level crossing incidents have involved local car drivers. The more serious incidents, including those at level crossings, have been:

- 17 August 1927. 27-year-old platelayer Harold Adams was struck and fatally injured by a train whilst he was working on the track near the Prince of Wales Bridge.
- 2 June 1931. Locomotive No 10, then still named Doctor Syn (the exchange of names with locomotive No 9 did not take place until later in the year), broke away from its tender, leaving its train near the Coastguard Cottages at Lade. The locomotive continued alone towards Dungeness where the combination of speed, curvature and cant deficiency caused it to derail on the loop and fall on its side. The locomotive was just over two weeks old at the time
- 10 May 1934. A train hauled by the Rolls-Royce locomotive was in collision with a large car at Bonnington Road (since renamed Eastbridge Road) level crossing in Dymchurch. The long-serving internal combustion locomotive (which carried no name at the time of the accident) was derailed and turned on its side, receiving significant damage and narrowly avoiding a fall into the dyke beside the road. The engine driver, Claude Webb, who was also Captain Howey's chauffeur, was slightly injured in the accident. A steam hauled engineers' train was coincidentally nearby at the time, and quickly able to render assistance. The damaged locomotive was sent to Robert Hudson Ltd in Leeds for repair, and returned to service later in the same year.
- 2 September 1935. Northern Chief was struck by a lorry on the level crossing with Bonnington Road (now known as Eastbridge Road), Dymchurch. The locomotive fell onto its right side coming to rest on the canal bridge. The tender stayed upright. Having sustained minimal damage, the loco was repaired quickly and returned to service. The lorry was a write-off.
- 16 May 1946. A train hauled by locomotive No 3 Southern Maid was in collision with a lorry at Eastbridge Road level crossing in Dymchurch. The locomotive was derailed, and fell into the drainage canal running beside the road. The engine driver was badly injured but survived. The lorry driver was killed. The locomotive was recovered from the water by an army crane, but required extensive repairs.
- 22 April 1947. A train hauled by locomotive No 7 Typhoon was in collision with a large agricultural tractor at an occupation crossing near Prince of Wales, south of Hythe. The subsequent investigation found that the tractor had become stuck on the rails as it had smooth steel wheels, with no spikes, studs or tyres; the tractor driver made no attempt to contact the signalman or warn approaching trains. The engine was derailed and turned on its side, but was not badly damaged and returned to service later the same month. The tractor was split in two and destroyed.
- 16 July 1952. A head-on collision between two passenger trains (one hauled by No 7 Typhoon, the other by No 8 Hurricane) occurred just north of Britannia Points. The station master at Dungeness, who was not in possession of the single line token, improperly issued the driver of the Up train with a single line ticket and verbally instructed him to take his train to Britannia Points and wait there to be shown the token by the driver of the approaching Down train before proceeding. The Up train over-ran Britannia Points causing the collision.
- 11 August 1952 The driver of a Down train on the Dungeness line, 21-year-old Jeffery Reddecliffe, was knocked out after striking his head on an overbridge. A passenger in the leading carriage, Leslie J. Ashman, saw this happen, left the carriage, clambered over the tender into the loco cab and stopped the train. Captain Howey later presented him with a sea fishing rod in gratitude for his bravery.
- 2 May 1954. A train driven by Bob Hobbs and hauled by locomotive No 5 Hercules was derailed at half mile curve, between New Romney and Greatstone. The cause of the incident was severe gale-force wind. The train was the 14.50 from Hythe to Dungeness, and the leading vehicle (behind the engine) was a light guard's van, of a type nicknamed "jumping jacks", as their relatively light weight made for an uncomfortable ride for the guard. In the severe weather, as the train passed over the exposed embankment of half mile curve, the jumping jack guard's van was blown over, and smashed on the embankment. Fortunately the guard, Mavis Thomas, had decided to ride in another coach, and so avoided injury. As the van turned over in the wind, it also tipped the locomotive's high-sided tender, which in turn tipped the locomotive which ended on its side down the embankment. The engine driver, Bob Hobbs, who was a highly experienced driver, had been alerted to the sequence of events by noises behind him, and was able to jump from the footplate, sustaining only cuts and grazes. All "jumping jack" guard's vans on the railway were withdrawn from service and scrapped.
- 27 May 1963. A train hauled by locomotive No 5 Hercules from Hythe to New Romney was suffering from a faulty boiler pressure gauge which was showing erratic readings. The workshop staff at New Romney had recalibrated the safety valves that morning so that they lifted at what the gauge showed as 180 lb sq in. In fact the gauge was reading high. After this the boiler was unable to maintain sufficient pressure to keep the train's vacuum brakes off and they were dragging. The train stalled at Palmarsh, but the driver managed to get it moving again, but at only 3 miles per hour (4.8 km/h). The train was struck from behind by the following service train, hauled by locomotive No 7 Typhoon which had been allowed into the section by the Hythe signalman before he had received line clear from Dymchurch. A number of carriages in both trains were derailed (some telescoped) and there were a number of injuries. The incident was reported in The Railway Magazine together with two photographs taken in the aftermath of the crash.
- 9 August 1967. A train hauled by locomotive No 5 Hercules driven by Jim Brodie over-ran the terminus at Hythe, resulting in a number of minor injuries. It is thought the engine driver was struck on the head at Prince of Wales Bridge, and lost consciousness, allowing the train to continue unchecked for the remaining 1 1/2 miles (2.4 km) into Hythe station where it crashed through buffer stops and continued into the station car park, coming to rest before reaching the main road. The driver could not subsequently recall whether his head had struck the stonework of the bridge, or whether he had been hit by an object thrown from the bridge. The incident received national newspaper coverage.
- 25 July 1968. A heavy double headed train of 23 coaches, hauled by locomotives No 7 Typhoon (train engine) and No 9 Winston Churchill (pilot engine), was struck by a car at Botolph's Bridge Road. The car was destroyed, but damage to the train was limited to the motion of locomotive No 9. The damaged engine was recovered to New Romney (towed by a shunting engine), and the other locomotive continued alone with the entire 23 coach train.
- April 1970. A train hauled by locomotive No 2 Northern Chief was in collision with a car at Botolph's Bridge level crossing, south of Palmarsh. The swift action of the engine driver, Cyril Carter, resulted in a low impact collision, and nobody was injured. The locomotive was slightly damaged. The car, an Austin 1100, was damaged, but not destroyed.
- August 1972. A passenger train was in collision with a circus caravan at St Mary's Road level crossing, Dymchurch. Nobody was injured.
- 6 August 1973. A train hauled by locomotive No 6 Samson was in collision with a stolen motor car at St Mary's Road level crossing, a short distance south of Dymchurch station. The locomotive was badly damaged and the engine driver, Peter Hobson, was killed. The locomotive was sent to Leeds for repair, returning to service the following year. Although not the first level crossing incident on the railway, it was the first to prove fatal to the engine driver, and initiated discussion which led to the gradual introduction of warning lights at all the railway's level crossings.
- August 1974. A train driven by driver George Barlow (believed to be driving locomotive No 7 Typhoon) was in collision with a car at Botolph's Bridge Road. There were no injuries, but the car was badly damaged, and the front carriage of the train was slightly damaged.
- 28 August 1975. A train hauled by locomotive No 7 Typhoon was in collision with a car on St Mary's Road level crossing, Dymchurch. The car, a Ford Corsair, was destroyed, and one of its occupants had to be cut free, having been trapped by her feet, but was not seriously injured. The train driver, Cyril Carter, was uninjured. The occupants of the car were a local young brother and sister, Roger Piper (20) and Belinda Piper (14) driving to the fish and chip shop, and witnesses reported that they had seen the approaching train but tried to race it to the level crossing. Their father John Piper was quoted in the local newspaper as having said, "Funnily enough, it is nearly always someone local who is involved", referring to accidents on Dymchurch's level crossings.
- 11 May 1993. A train propelled by locomotive No 12 John Southland driven by Stuart Barratt was in collision with a white van at Eastbridge Road level crossing, Dymchurch. The train was an empty coaching stock (ECS) working which had earlier operated the daily school service for pupils returning home from New Romney. The locomotive was propelling from the rear, and the leading vehicle was Driving Van Trailer (DVT) No 105. The transit van and the railway DVT both fell into the dyke beside the road. The van driver was uninjured. The Guard, Simon Oldfield, who was travelling in the DVT, was briefly trapped under water, but was able to free himself and swim to safety. The DVT was heavily damaged and had to be completely rebuilt. During this rebuild it was adapted to become the railway's first wheelchair accessible coach. Two other passenger coaches, 804 and 807, were also seriously damaged in the incident. The van driver admitted fault but claimed that his brakes had failed. The subsequent police investigation revealed that the brakes had operated correctly, but that the van driver had vainly hoped to beat the train to the crossing. Police also found that the van's tyres were bald, and that it had no current road tax. A large crane recovered both vehicles from the water.
- 3 August 2003. A train hauled by locomotive No 5 Hercules was in collision with a car at Burmarsh Road level crossing protected by flashing warning lights. The engine driver, 31-year-old Kevin Crouch, died at the scene, and some passengers were treated for shock and minor injuries. The locomotive was seriously damaged and underwent extensive repairs, returning to service in 2005. The female car driver, 22-year-old Marie Scrace whose baby was a passenger in the vehicle, had ignored or failed to see the warning lights. Scrace and her baby were taken to hospital, but were not badly hurt. The railway and the Health and Safety Executive instigated an investigation, and the woman was arrested on suspicion of causing death by dangerous driving. Although acquitted, she was found guilty of the lesser charge of careless driving.
- 10 July 2005. A train hauled by locomotive No 8 Hurricane was in collision with a car at Battery Road level crossing near Dungeness. The driver of the train, Suzanne Martin (the wife of the railway's general manager), was killed. Several passengers were treated for shock. The locomotive was seriously damaged and underwent extensive repairs, returning to service the following year. The car driver, 20-year-old Richard Isted, had ignored or failed to see warning lights and was arrested at the scene by Kent Police. He subsequently appeared in court charged with driving without due care and attention, to which he pleaded guilty.
- 10 September 2016. A passenger train was struck by a tractor pulling a heavily laden hay trailer, on occupation crossing number 10 (approximately half a mile north of Dymchurch station). Locomotive No 1 Green Goddess and its tender were both derailed and thrown onto their sides. The leading coach was also derailed but remained upright. The train driver and four passengers sustained minor injuries.
- 28 August 2019 Two passenger trains ended up on the single track line between New Romney and Romney Sands stations. The trains stopped 346 yards (316 m) apart. An investigation by the Rail Accident Investigation Branch found that the cause was a misunderstanding by the trainee stationmaster at Romney Sands who issued a ticket without having the token in his possession, and the acceptance of the ticket by the driver of the train from Romney Sands without having seen the token for the section. Comparisons were made with the Abermule train collision in 1921. As a result of this incident the New Romney to Romney Sands section of the Single Line was equipped with Electric Token Block equipment.

=== Level crossings ===
Following the two fatal accidents in 2003 and 2005, the railway began a programme of level crossing refurbishment. There are a number of occupation crossings with local control, where the railway meets farm tracks, but of the eighteen junctions of the railway with public highways, five are road bridges and the other thirteen are level crossings. During the late 1970s to early 1980s, all thirteen had been converted to automatic open crossings (AOCLs) by installation of flashing warning lights. Between 2006 and 2016, twelve of them were upgraded to Automatic Barrier Crossing Locally Monitored (ABCL) status. This involved the decommissioning of the life expired AOCL control equipment, the installation of lifting half-barriers and totally new control and train detection systems, at a cost of around £90,000 per crossing. On 22 March 2017 the crossing at Romney Sands was commissioned as an ABCL, this means that all the 13 crossings on the line have barriers and it brought the level crossing upgrade program to a close. During the single line crossing upgrades the Road Signal heads (Wig Wags) have either been replaced with new ones (Battery Road and Dungeness Road) or had their existing heads refurbished.

== Ownership and operation ==
=== Ownership ===
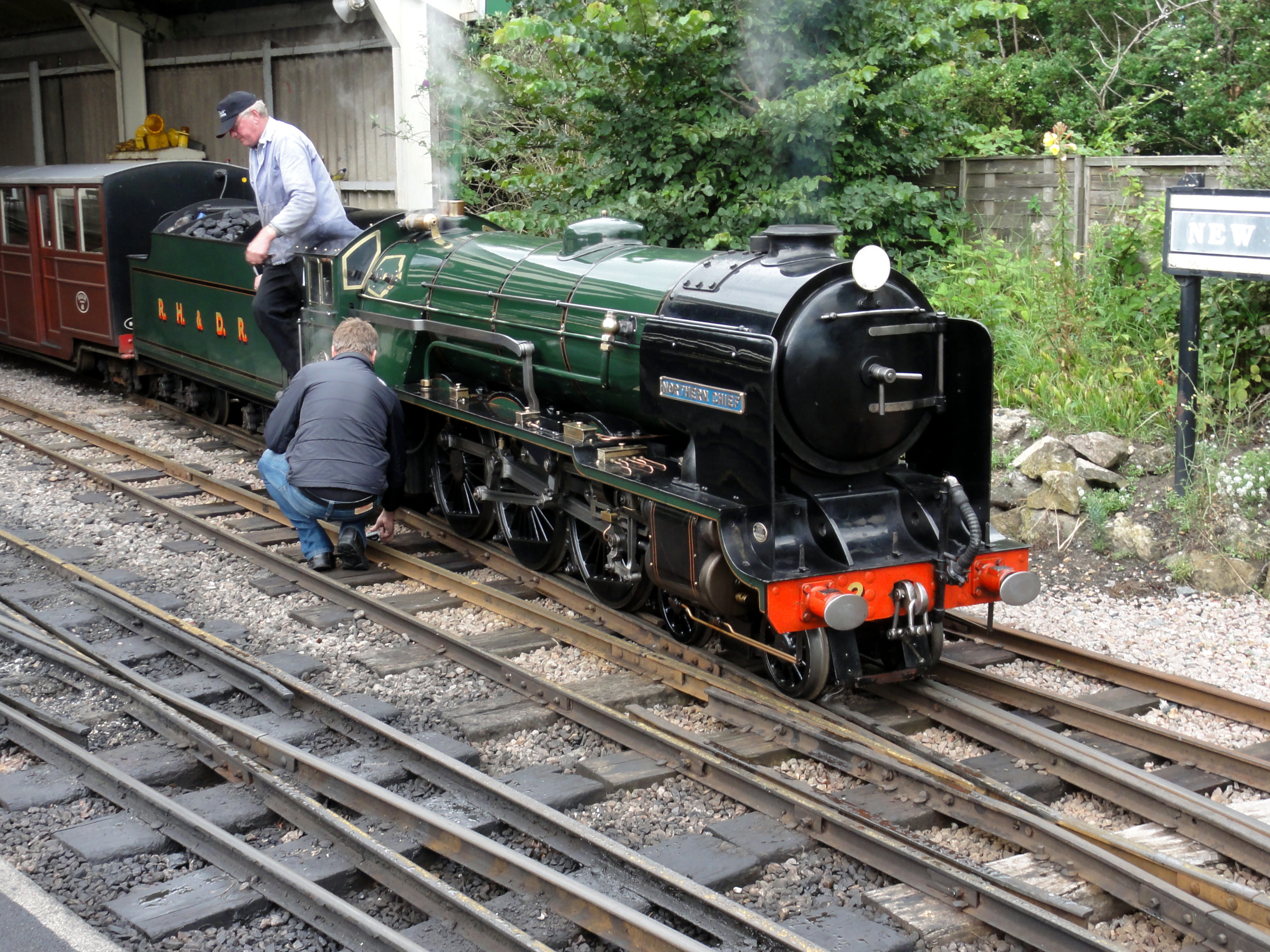
RH&DR Engine No 2 Northern Chief at New Romney

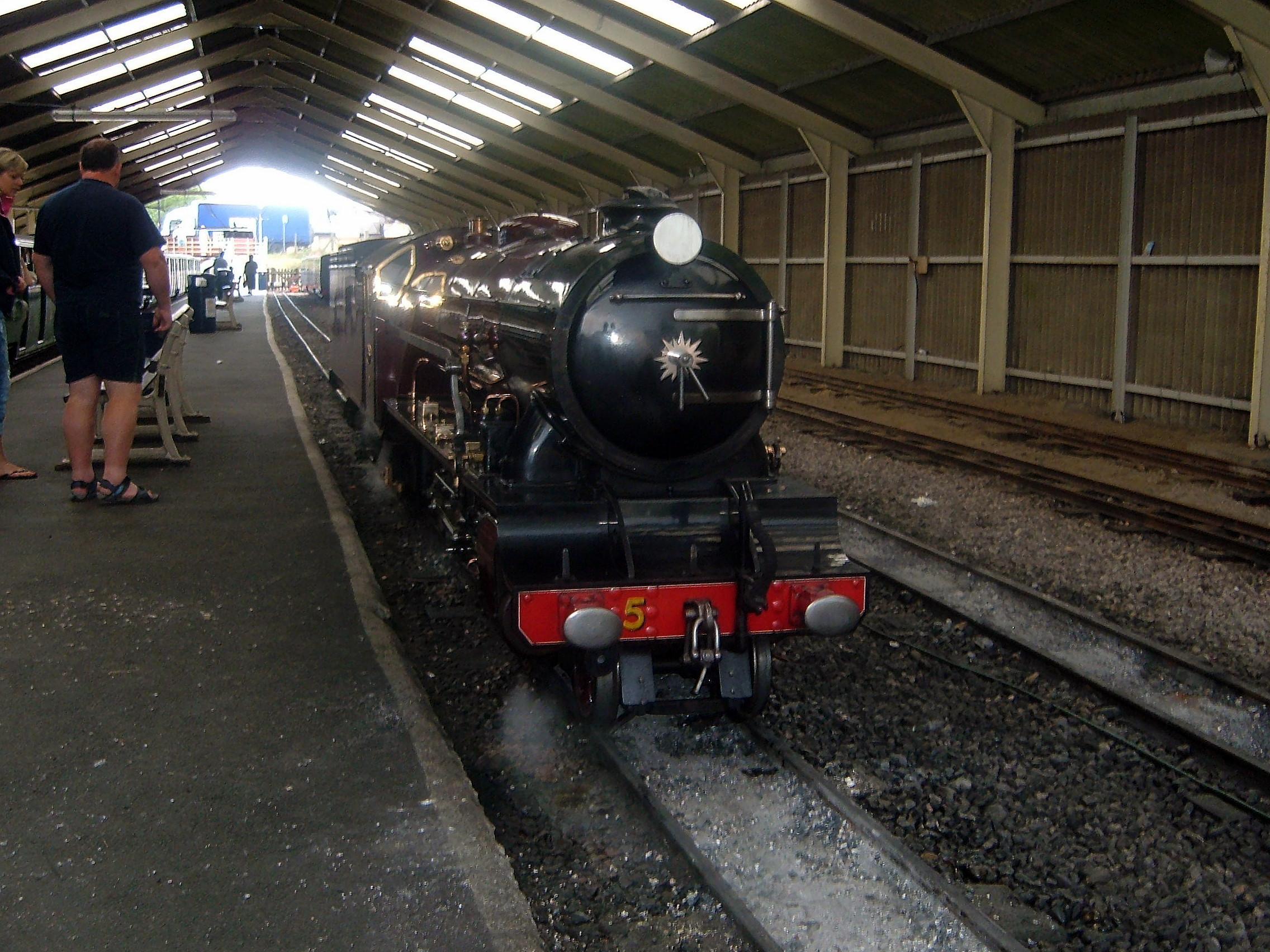
No 5 Hercules at New Romney

The railway is owned by Romney, Hythe & Dymchurch Railway PLC, which was originally incorporated as a private limited company on 15 November 1971 under the name RH&D Light Railway Holding Company Limited, adopting its present title on re-registration as a "new" public limited company under Section 8(3) of the Companies Act 1980 on 10 May 1982. Its shareholders (of whom there are now over a thousand) travel free of charge on trains, but receive no financial dividend on their shareholdings, instead re-investing all operating profit back into the company. By 14 June 2015 there were 25 "Gold Medallion" shareholders owning 5,000 or more shares each and 119 "Silver Medallion" shareholders owning between 500 and 4,999 shares each. The remaining shareholders owned between 100 and 499 shares each. The PLC's issued and fully paid share capital at that date was £508,858 in £1 Ordinary Shares.

Shares in the PLC remain available to the public at a cost of £4 each. The minimum holding is 100 shares, but above this number potential shareholders may purchase any amount. The two largest shareholders in the PLC are the Romney, Hythe & Dymchurch Railway Association with 78,604 shares (15.45%) and the estate of the late Sir William McAlpine (leader of the group which saved the railway from closure in 1972) which holds 38,837 (7.63%). The PLC controls the entire share capital of the older statutory Romney, Hythe and Dymchurch Light Railway Company, incorporated by The Romney, Hythe and Dymchurch Light Railway Order 1926. It acquired a controlling interest in the statutory company on 14 February 1972 for £106,947.64 when it purchased 50,447 of the 51,000 Statutory Company shares then in issue. Since February 1972 it has bought out all of the minority shareholders in the Statutory Company which is now a wholly owned subsidiary.

The Romney, Hythe and Dymchurch Light Railway (Amendment) Order 1974 (SI 1974/1024) altered the capital structure of the Statutory Company, allowing its issued share capital and borrowings to amount in aggregate to £400,000 (instead of the previously completely inadequate £68,000). On 1 October 1975 the statutory company created a further 24,000 new shares, bringing its issued capital up to £75,000 in £1 shares. The PLC subscribed for 23,950 of these new shares and the remaining 50 were acquired by a director of the statutory company in order to bring their holding up to the minimum for directors of 250 shares specified in the 1926 light railway order. Directors' shareholdings in the statutory company are subject to rights of pre-emption by the PLC and are therefore treated for most purposes as being owned by that company.

It is usual for the two companies to share the same board of directors; with the anomaly that whilst the Romney, Hythe & Dymchurch Railway Association has been granted a seat on the statutory company's board it has no direct representation on the PLC's board.

=== Directors ===
The Romney, Hythe and Dymchurch Light Railway Order 1926 restricted the maximum number of directors of the statutory company to five and named Captain John Edwards Presgrave Howey, Gladys May Howey, Captain John Alexander Holder, Major William Bertram Bell and Henry Greenly as the first directors. Greenly never owned more than 50 shares in the company so was ineligible to sit on the board and Holder did not achieve the qualifying holding of 250 shares until 30 December 1929. Gladys Howey was also ineligible until 1931 when her shareholding reached 250 and she was able to join the board.

Section 5 of the Romney, Hythe and Dymchurch Light Railway (Amendment) Order 1974 increased the maximum number of directors from five to ten and also set the minimum number of directors at three.

=== Operation ===
The day-to-day operation of the railway is in the hands of a full-time permanent staff of around 35 assisted by 5 part-time permanent staff. These include a general manager, departmental managers (engineering, commercial and operations) and a large number of engineering staff (from locomotive fitters to permanent way gangers) and catering staff (the New Romney and Dungeness cafes and the restaurant adjoining Hythe station are open all year round; some of the railway's other commercial outlets are more seasonal). In addition to this core staff, seasonal employees are taken on through the summer season, particularly to increase the staffing of the shops and catering outlets and to provide the required levels of staffing at stations. At the height of the operating season there are over 60 staff on the payroll.

== See also ==
- Fifteen-inch gauge railway
- Ravenglass and Eskdale Railway
- Shuzenji Romney Railway, A miniature railway at the Niji-no-Sato theme park in Izu, Shizuoka Prefecture, Japan, which was inspired by the RH&DR

== Sources ==
- Anon. (1926) " Romney, Hythe & Dymchurch Light Railway]", Railway Magazine, 59 (September), p. 213–218
- BBC News (2005) "Train crash killed manager's wife", BBC Online, accessed 7 October 2007
- Companies House file for company number 01031179 Romney, Hythe & Dymchurch Railway Public Limited Company
- Crowhurst, A. R. W. and Scarth R. N. (2004) Locomotives of the Romney, Hythe and Dymchurch Railway, Workshop Press, 36 p.
- Davies, W. J. K. (1988) The Romney, Hythe & Dymchurch Railway, Rev. ed., Newton Abbott: David & Charles Publishers, ISBN 0-715392-25-5
- Kidner, R. W. (1967) The Romney, Hythe & Dymchurch Railway, Lingfield: Oakwood Press, ISBN 0-85361-053-3
- Morris, O. J. (1946) The World's Smallest Public Railway, 1st ed., London: Ian Allan Limited
- Sapsted, D. (2004) "Woman in fatal train crash fined", The Daily Telegraph, Online news, accessed 7 October 2007
- Ransome-Wallis, P (1962) The World's Smallest Public Railway, Shepperton: Ian Allan Limited
- Ransome-Wallis, P (1970) The World's Smallest Public Railway, 6th ed., Shepperton: Ian Allan Limited
- Shaw, Frederic Joseph (1958). Little Railways of the World. Berkeley, California: Howell-North. OCLC 988744.
- Snell, J. B. (1993) One Man's Railway, Rev. ed., Nairn: David St John Thomas, ISBN 0-946537-80-1
- Steel, E. A. & Steel, E. H. (1973) The Miniature World of Henry Greenly, Kings Langley: Model & Allied Publications, ISBN 0-85242-306-3
- Wolfe, C. S. (1976) A Historical Guide to the Romney, Hythe, & Dymchurch Railway, New Romney: Romney, Hythe & Dymchurch Railway Association
