= Romney Sands railway station =

Former railway station in England

Coordinates: 50°57′30″N 0°57′47″E

Romney Sands
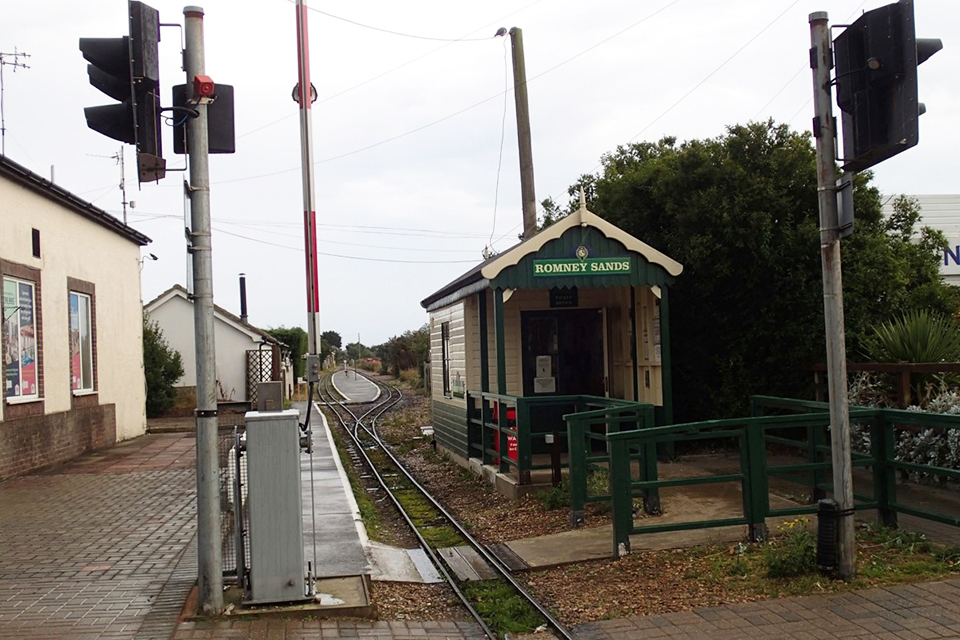
- Station signal box, looking towards Dungeness

General information
- Location: Romney Marsh, Folkestone & Hythe; England
- Grid reference: TR081219
- System: Station on heritage railway
- Manager: RHDR
- Platforms: 2

Key dates
- May 1928: Opened as Maddiesons Camp
- 1940: closed
- 1947: reopened
- 1974: resited
- 1980: renamed Romney Sands
Location

Romney Sands Railway Station is a station on the Romney, Hythe and Dymchurch Railway in Kent, England. It is located on the bleakest part of the Romney Marsh, a shingle peninsula.

== Station history ==
The station opened in May 1928 and was originally named "Maddieson's Camp" after the adjacent holiday camp which it served. The pre-war station consisted of nothing more than station name boards. After the Second World War the double track mainline was reduced to single track, and a single concrete platform was provided. There were no other changes until 1973.

In 1973, the decision was made to install a passing loop to enable the operation of an hourly train service between New Romney and Dungeness; however, the site had insufficient space. The station was therefore re-located to the other side of the holiday camp entrance road. The passing loop was installed during the winter of 1973-1974, together with an island platform and a booking office (the first ever station building at this site).

Although the holiday camp still operates, following a change of ownership it is no longer known as Maddieson's Camp. Consequently, the railway station was renamed Romney Sands around 1980.

== War Department Branch Line ==
Between 1929 and 1951, Romney Sands was a junction, with a branch line curving away inland from south of the station. This line was constructed at the request of the War Office and provided a train service to a secret military installation working on acoustic aircraft detection at Denge. Their work was highly successful, but almost immediately replaced by the superior invention known as radar. The War Department operated their own locomotive, which was stabled at Hythe engine shed, and for which they had running rights for the full length of the railway. This is the only independently owned locomotive to have seen long-term service on the railway. After the war the War Department Branch Line saw a further six years of service (freight only) by the RHDR, which transported large quantities of uncrushed shingle by train to Hythe, where a ramp system was used to transfer the cargo to road haulage. This freight service ended in 1951, and the line was lifted at the end of that year.

== Photo gallery ==
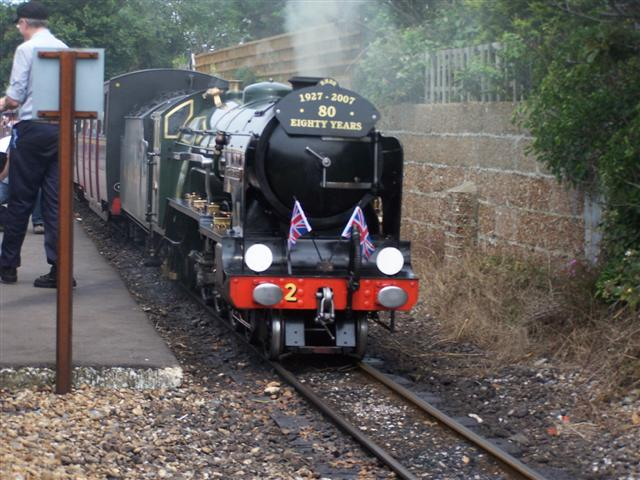
No.2 Northern Chief waiting to leave the station for Dungeness

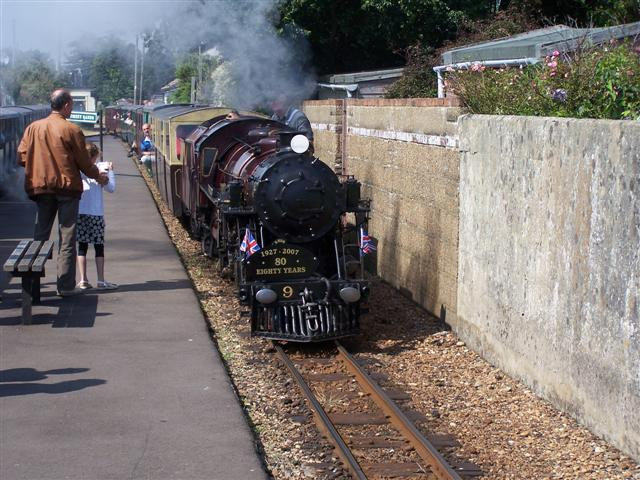
No. 9 Winston Churchill arriving from Romney

Preceding station	Heritage railways	Following station
Dungeness Terminus	Romney, Hythe & Dymchurch Railway Main line	New Romney towards Hythe
Former service
Lade Line open, station closed towards Dungeness	Romney, Hythe & Dymchurch Railway Main line	Greatstone Dunes Line open, station closed towards Hythe
Disused railways
War Department Halt Line and station closed Terminus	Romney, Hythe & Dymchurch Railway War Department Branch Line	Terminus
