= Dungeness railway station =

Railway station in Kent, England

Coordinates: 50.9144°N 0.9704°E

Dungeness
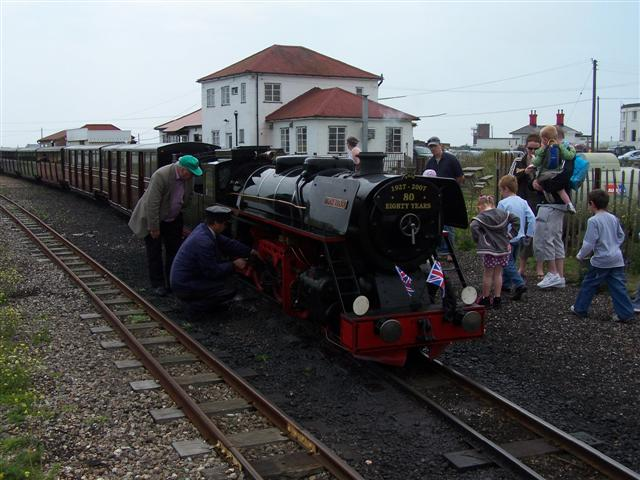
- A train with the station buildings beyond. The platform ends just behind the locomotive.

General information
- Location: Dungeness, Folkestone & Hythe; England
- Grid reference: TR088169
- System: Station on heritage railway
- Manager: RHDR
- Platforms: 2

Key dates
- August 1928: Opened
- 30 June 1940: Closed
- 21 March 1947: Reopened
Location

Dungeness railway station is a station on the Romney, Hythe and Dymchurch Railway on Romney Marsh in Kent.

== History ==
The first part of line to Dungeness was opened on 24 May 1928, a year after the line reached New Romney. However, construction was complete only as far as The Pilot Inn, where a turning triangle was installed, so that locomotives could change direction when preparing to return to New Romney or Hythe. Construction work continued towards Dungeness, and the final section of the line (including this station) opened in early August 1928. Operations have continued at this station ever since except 1940-1947.

== Description ==
It is one of only a very few stations in England to be situated on a balloon loop, allowing trains to return with the engine pointing forwards without needing to uncouple and reverse the locomotive, or use a turntable.

Facilities at this station included two booking offices (one currently redundant), a shop, an extensive cafeteria and restaurant, toilets, and a waiting shelter. There is a water tower for the benefit of steam locomotives. Until 2017 there was only one formal (concreted) platform, although in the summer trains sometimes arrived at and departed from the station's run-round loop even though no platform surface was provided. Since 2017 a second platform surface has been provided.

The station was temporarily closed in October 2015 for extensive re-building with an expected completion date of Easter 2016. This plan was not fulfilled however as the contractor appointed to undertake the work went into receivership shortly after demolition of the existing buildings was complete. Work was re-commenced by a new contractor shortly before Christmas 2015 and by late January 2016 the foundations were largely complete.

The station re-opened for Easter 2016 using RML2360, a Routemaster from the Arriva London heritage fleet, as a temporary booking office and souvenir shop. This vehicle had previously been rebuilt as an exhibition bus and was ideally suited for the purpose. The re-building work at Dungeness was finished in May 2016.

== Photogallery ==
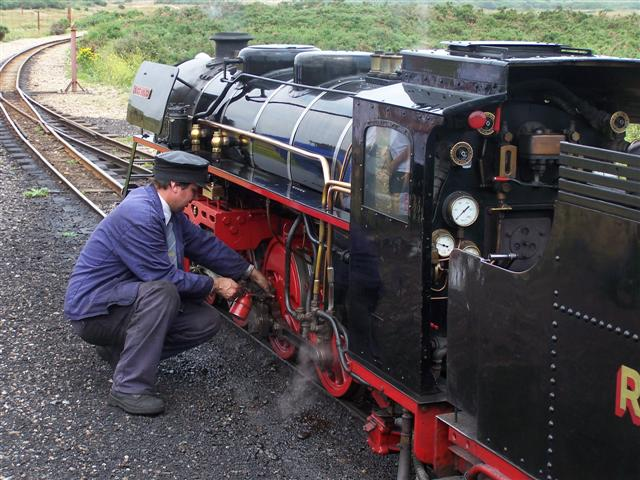
A driver oiling his engine at Dungeness

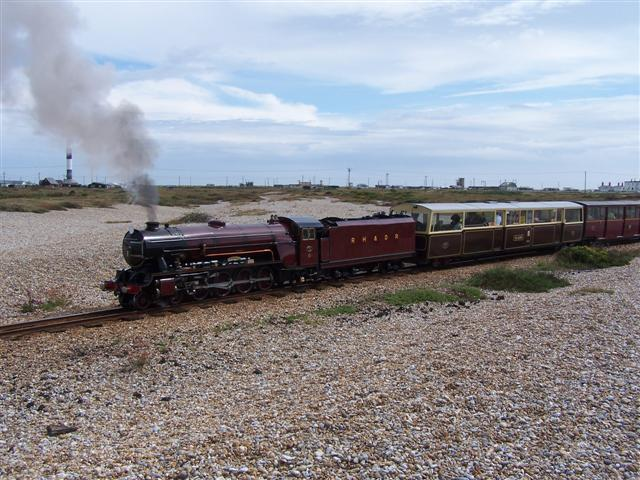
No.5 Hercules leaving Dungeness

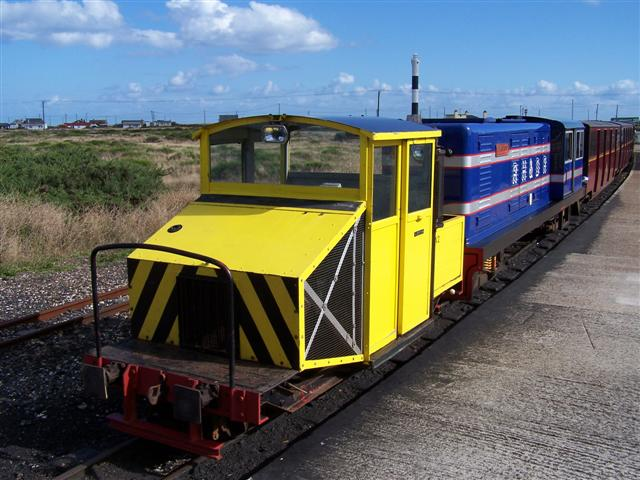
Diesels no.14 and PW2 on a service train at Dungeness

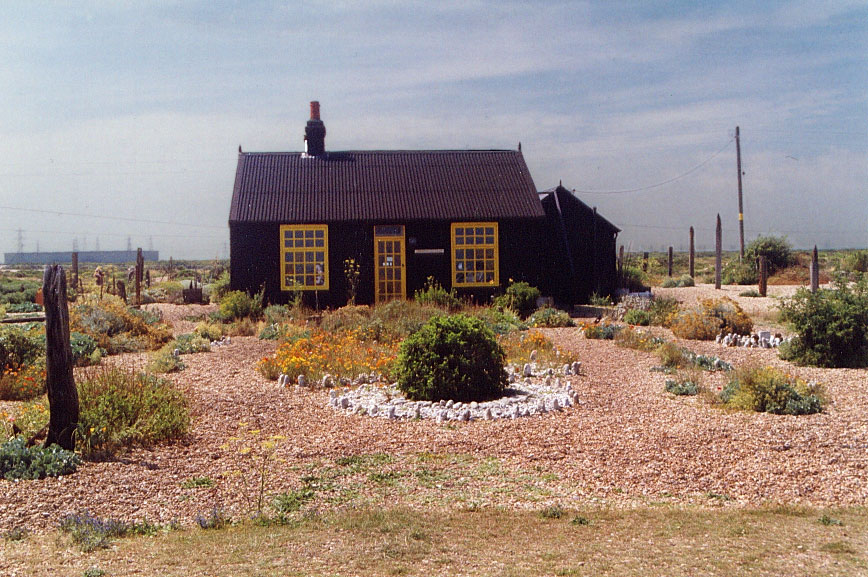
A nearby cottage in Dungeness "village"

Preceding station	Heritage railways	Following station
Romney Sands One-way operation	Romney, Hythe & Dymchurch Railway (Dungeness loop)	Romney Sands towards Hythe
Former service
Britannia Points Halt Line open, station closed One-way operation	Romney, Hythe & Dymchurch Railway (Dungeness loop)	Britannia Points Halt Line open, station closed towards Hythe
