= Burmarsh Road railway station =

Disused railway station in England

Coordinates: 51°02′10″N 1°00′15″E

Burmarsh Road
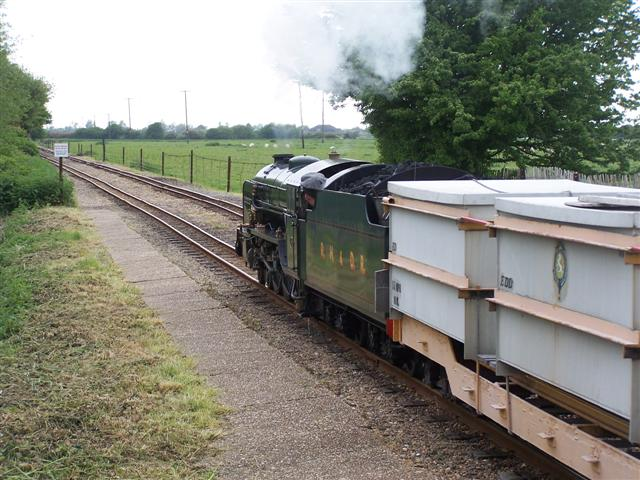
- A freight train for New Romney passes the platforms

General information
- Location: East Dymchurch, Folkestone & Hythe; England
- Grid reference: TR107306
- System: Station on heritage railway
- Manager: RHDR
- Platforms: 2

Key dates
- 16 July 1927: Opened
- 1940: closed
- 1946: reopened
- 1950: closed for regular service
- 1977: reopened for schoolchildrens trains
- 2010: reopened for selected service trains
- 24 July 2015: station closed (schools trains withdrawn)
Location

Burmarsh Road railway station is a station on the Romney, Hythe and Dymchurch Railway in Kent, England. It is four miles south of Hythe.

== History ==
Officially opened on 16 July 1927, this station was then called Burmarsh for East Dymchurch and was equipped with two platforms, a booking office, a waiting room, and possibly a signal box (historical accounts vary on this last point, most suggesting the booking office housed a lever frame controlling just two signals). Later the station name was changed to Dymchurch Bay. Traffic levels fell sharply after the Second World War, and the station was eventually reduced in status to a halt and again renamed as Burmarsh Road Halt. It closed in 1948, re-opened in 1950, but finally closed again at the end of that same year, when the station buildings were demolished. The roof of the booking office was left in situ, on pillars (with the walls removed), to form a waiting shelter in the event of re-opening, but this structure was also demolished a few years later. However, the station was again re-opened on 7 September 1977 as the starting point of the school train service run for Kent County Council, transporting local children to Southlands Comprehensive School in New Romney. Declining use meant that the school train last ran on 24 July 2015.

== Today ==
Since that time Burmarsh Road station has found a new lease of life. Officially it was listed on the Railway's ticket-issuing computer systems as a station (not a halt) until 2010, in which year it was officially re-designated (again) as "Burmarsh Road Halt". From 1977 to 2009, the only trains to call here were the school service trains, and private charter trains, although as the general public are permitted to travel on the school train service on certain off-season days of the year, it was still possible to board trains, and alight from them, at this station. From 2010, however, certain normal service trains are once again timetabled to stop at Burmarsh Road, in conjunction with open days and special events at the nearby Haguelands Alpaca Farm, which is served by the station. Burmarsh Road appeared again on the railway's 2010 public timetable for the first time since 1950.

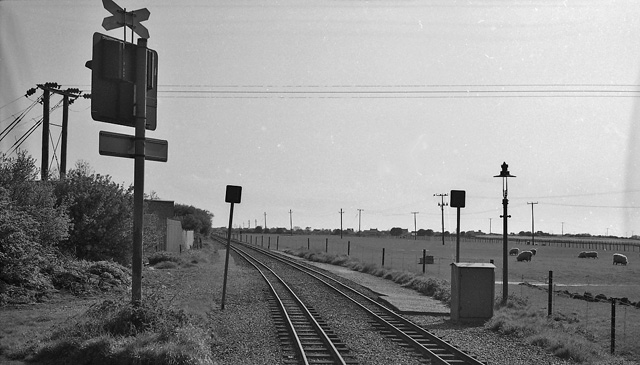
Burmarsh Road Halt in 1983

== Facilities ==
Today there are no surviving station buildings, In November 2007 Burmarsh Road saw its first fabric upgrade since re-opening in 1977, when the 'down' platform (which had become very uneven) was completely resurfaced. There are still two platforms, and the 'up' platform remains very much in need of similar resurfacing. There are electrical cabinets and control panels installed at the station, for operation of the lights and barriers of Burmarsh Road level crossing, together with closed circuit television cameras and recording equipment. The only other significant structure is a memorial to a train driver killed here in 2003 (see below).

== Future expansion ==
Following the 2007 facilities upgrade, with platform resurfacing, the railway's General Manager has now confirmed press speculation that Burmarsh Road station may see further expansion in coming years. If funding is secured for the building of a multiple-unit shuttle train, a regular passenger service may resume.

== Fatal accident ==
Burmarsh Road station was the site of a fatal accident in August 2003, in which engine driver Kevin Crouch lost his life. A local woman whose car had failed to stop for flashing level crossing lights was later cleared of a charge of careless driving.

Preceding station	Heritage railways	Following station
Former service
Dymchurch Line and station open towards Dungeness	Romney, Hythe & Dymchurch Railway	Botolph's Bridge Halt Line open, station closed towards Hythe
