= New Romney (constituency) =

Former parliamentary constituency in the United Kingdom, 1801–1832

- Former cinque Port constituency for the House of Commons
- County: Kent
- Borough: New Romney

1371–1832
- Seats: 2

New Romney was a parliamentary constituency in Kent, which elected two Members of Parliament (MPs) to the House of Commons from 1371 until 1832, when it was abolished by the Great Reform Act.

New Romney was a Cinque Port, which made it of a nominally different status from a parliamentary borough. The constituency consisted of the town of New Romney; it had once been a flourishing port but by the 19th century the harbour had been destroyed and there was no maritime trade, the main economic activity being grazing cattle on Romney Marsh. In 1831, the population of the constituency was 978, and the town contained 165 houses.

The right to vote was reserved to the Mayor and Common Council of the town; however, many of these were customs or excise officers, who were disqualified from voting by the Parliament Act 1782, so that in the early 19th century there were only 8 voters. The high proportion of voters holding paid government posts before this change in the law meant that New Romney was sometimes considered to be a "treasury borough" (that is, a constituency whose seats were in the gift of the government); but in practice the Dering family, local landowners, were even more influential and could sometimes defy government pressure.

The Dering influence in New Romney seems mainly to have been achieved by letting out property to voters and their relatives at easy rents and without leases. In 1761, for example, the despairing Whig MP, Rose Fuller, explained to the prime minister, the Duke of Newcastle, that he had no chance of re-election since Dering had turned against him, because "several of the governing men are graziers and the Deering and Furnese family have together a very great estate in the neighbouring marsh which is very profitable to and easy for tenants". The reduction in the number of voters naturally made this influence easier, or at least cheaper, to exert.

New Romney was abolished as a constituency by the Reform Act 1832, the town being incorporated into the new East Kent county division.

== Members of Parliament ==
=== 1371–1640 ===
Parliament	First Member	Second Member
1386	Simon Lunceford	John Salerne
1388 (February)	William Holyngbroke	John Salerne
1388 (September)	William Holyngbroke	John Ellis
1390 (January)	John Ive	James Tiece
1390 (November)	Edmund Huchoun	James Tiece
1391	John Ellis	John Salerne II
1393	Andrew Colyn	Robert Geffe
1394		
1395	John Gardener	William Child
1397 (January)	John Yon	Robert Geffe
1397 (September)		
1399	John Gardener	John Talbot
1401	William Clitheroe	John Gardener
1402	John Lunceford	John Ive
1404 (January)		
1404 (October)		
1406	Robert Geffe	Thomas Rokeslee
1407	John Roger	Brice Scherte
1410	John Adam	John Lunceford
1411	William Clitheroe	James Lowys
1413 (February)	William Clitheroe	John Adam
1413 (May)	William Clitheroe	James Lowys
1414 (April)	Richard Clitheroe	John Lunceford
1414 (November)	William Clitheroe	John Maffey
1415	Richard Clitheroe	James Lowys
1416 (March)	Richard Clitheroe	John Adam
1416 (October)	Stephen Harry	Thomas Sparwe
1417	William Clitheroe	James Tiece
1419	Thomas Rokeslee	Thomas Smith
1420	Richard Clitheroe	Stephen Harry
1421 (May)	Richard Clitheroe	James Lowys
1421 (December)	Thomas Sparwe	Peter Newene
1510	John Holl	Thomas Lambard
1512	Sir John Scott	Clement Baker
1515	Richard Stuppeny	Clement Baker
1523	Robert Paris	not known
1529	Richard Gibson, died and replaced 1535 by John Marshall	John Bunting
1536	John Bunting	?John Marshall
1539	William Tadlowe	William Garrard
1542	William Tadlowe	William Asnothe
1545	not known	
1547	John Dering, died and replaced 1552 by William Tadlowe	Peter Hayman
1553 (March)	Simon Padyham	not known
1553 (October)	William Tadlowe	?Sir John Guildford
by 1553	John Cheseman	
1554 (April)	John Cheseman	Richard Bunting
1554 (November)	Gregory Holton	William Oxendon
1555	Richard Baker	John Herbert
1558	Simon Padyham	?Thomas Randolph
1559	John Cheseman	William Eppes
1562–3	Sir Christopher Alleyne	William Eppes
1571	William Eppes	Edmund Morrante
1572	William Wilcocks, died and replaced July 1574 by William Eppes	Edward Wilcocks
1584	Richard Williams	William Southland
1586	William Southland	Robert Thurbarne
1588	Reginald Scot	William Southland
1593	John Mynge	Robert Bawle
1597	George Coppyn	James Thurbarne
1601	Thomas Lake	John Mynge
1604-1611	Sir Robert Remington	John Plommer
1614	Sir Arthur Ingram	Robert Wilcock
1621-1622	Sir Peter Manwood	Francis Fetherston
1624	Francis Fetherston	Richard Godfrey
1625	Sir Edmund Verney	Richard Godfrey
1626	Richard Godfrey	Thomas Brett
1628	Thomas Godfrey	Thomas Brett
1629-1640	No Parliaments summoned	

=== 1640–1832 ===
Year	First member	First party	Second member	Second party
April 1640				
November 1640	Thomas Webb (Note: Expelled for being a monopolist, January 1641.)	Royalist	Sir Norton Knatchbull (Note: Created a baronet, August 1641.)	Parliamentarian
1641	Richard Browne		Sir Norton Knatchbull	Parliamentarian
December 1648	Browne not recorded as sitting after Pride's Purge		Knatchbull excluded in Pride's Purge - seat vacant	
1653	New Romney was unrepresented in the Barebones Parliament and the First and Second Parliaments of the Protectorate			
January 1659	Lambert Godfrey		Sir Robert Honywood	
May 1659	Not represented in the restored Rump			
April 1660	Sir Norton Knatchbull		John Knatchbull	
1661	Sir Norton Knatchbull		Sir Charles Berkeley (Note: Created Viscount Fitzhardinge (in the Peerage of Ireland), July 1663.)	
1665	Sir Norton Knatchbull		Hon. Henry Brouncker (Note: Expelled from the House of Commons on 21 April 1668 for his actions at the Battle of Lowestoft in 1665, when he falsified a signal which prevented the English navy pursuing the defeated Dutch fleet and capitalising on their victory.)	
1668	Sir Norton Knatchbull		Sir Charles Sedley	
1679	Paul Barret		Sir Charles Sedley	
1685	Sir William Goulston		Thomas Chudleigh	
1689	John Brewer		James Chadwick	
1690	John Brewer		Sir Charles Sedley	
1695	John Brewer		Sir William Twysden (Note: Twysden was also elected for Appleby, which he chose to represent, and never sat for New Romney.)	
1696	John Brewer		Sir Charles Sedley	
1701	John Brewer		Edward Goulston	
1702	John Brewer		Sir Benjamin Bathurst	
1704	John Brewer		Walter Whitfield	
1710	Robert Furnese (Note: Succeeded to a baronetcy as Sir Robert Furnese, November 1712.)	Whig	Walter Whitfield	
1713	Robert Furnese	Whig	Viscount Sondes	
1722	Robert Furnese	Whig	David Papillon	
1727 (Note: At the election of 1727, Essington and Papillon were returned as elected, but on petition they were held not to have been duly elected.)	John Essington		David Papillon	
April 1728	Sir Robert Austen		Sir Robert Furnese (Note: Furnese was also elected for Kent, which he chose to represent, and did not sit again for New Romney.)	Whig
May 1728	Sir Robert Austen		David Papillon (Note: Papillon was re-elected in 1734 but had also been elected for Dover, which he chose to represent, and did not sit again for New Romney.)	
1734	Stephen Bisse		David Papillon	
1736	Stephen Bisse		Sir Robert Austen	
1741	Henry Furnese		Sir Francis Dashwood	Tory
1756	Rose Fuller	Whig	Sir Francis Dashwood	Tory
1761	Sir Edward Dering	Tory	Thomas Knight	
1768	Sir Edward Dering	Tory	Richard Jackson	
1770	John Morton	Tory	Richard Jackson	
1774	Sir Edward Dering	Tory	Richard Jackson	
April 1784	Sir Edward Dering	Tory	John Smith	
June 1784	Sir Edward Dering	Tory	Richard Atkinson	
1785	Sir Edward Dering	Tory	John Henniker	
1787	Richard Joseph Sullivan		John Henniker	
1790	Richard Joseph Sullivan		Sir Elijah Impey	
1796	John Fordyce		John Willett Willett	
1802	Manasseh Lopes (Note: Created a baronet, November 1805.)		John Willett Willett	
1806	William Windham	Whig	Sir John Perring, 1st Baronet	Whig
1807	Earl of Clonmell	Tory	Hon. George Ashburnham	Tory
1812	Admiral Sir John Duckworth	Tory	William Mitford	Tory
1817	Cholmeley Dering	Tory	William Mitford	Tory
1818	Andrew Strahan	Tory	Richard Erle-Drax-Grosvenor	
1819	Andrew Strahan	Tory	Richard Erle-Drax-Grosvenor	Whig
1820	George Hay Dawkins-Pennant	Tory	Richard Erle-Drax-Grosvenor	Whig
1826	George Hay Dawkins-Pennant	Tory	George Tapps	Tory
1830	Arthur Hill-Trevor	Ultra-Tory	William Miles (Note: Created a baronet, 1859.)	Ultra-Tory/Tory
March 1831	Sir Roger Gresley, Bt	Tory	William Miles	Ultra-Tory/Tory
April 1831	Sir Edward Cholmeley Dering	Tory	William Miles	Ultra-Tory/Tory
1832	Constituency abolished			

== Sources ==
- Robert Beatson, "A Chronological Register of Both Houses of Parliament" (London: Longman, Hurst, Res & Orme, 1807)
- D Brunton & D H Pennington, Members of the Long Parliament (London: George Allen & Unwin, 1954)
- Cobbett's Parliamentary history of England, from the Norman Conquest in 1066 to the year 1803 (London: Thomas Hansard, 1808)
- J. E. Neale, The Elizabethan House of Commons (London: Jonathan Cape, 1949)
- T. H. B. Oldfield, The Representative History of Great Britain and Ireland (London: Baldwin, Cradock & Joy, 1816)
- J Holladay Philbin, Parliamentary Representation 1832 - England and Wales (New Haven: Yale University Press, 1965)
- Henry Stooks Smith, The Parliaments of England from 1715 to 1847 (2nd edition, edited by FWS Craig - Chichester: Parliamentary Reference Publications, 1973)
- Frederic A Youngs, jr, "Guide to the Local Administrative Units of England, Vol I" (London: Royal Historical Society, 1979)
- Leigh Rayment's Historical List of MPs – Constituencies beginning with "N" (part 2)
