= Robert Paris =

Robert Paris may refer to:

- Robert Paris (footballer) (born 1978), footballer for the Anguilla national team
- Robert Paris (MP) (bef. 1487–c. 1550), English politician
- Bob Paris (born 1959), American writer, activist, actor and former bodybuilder
- Rob Paris (producer), American film producer
- Rob "Blye" Paris, Canadian rapper
- Robert Parys (died 1408), English politician

== See also ==
- Count Robert of Paris, an 1832 novel by Walter Scott
- Robert of Paris, a 12th-century cardinal-prebyster of Sant'Eusebio in Rome
