= St Mary's Bay railway station =

Railway station in Kent, England

Coordinates: 51°00′41″N 0°58′28″E

St Mary's Bay
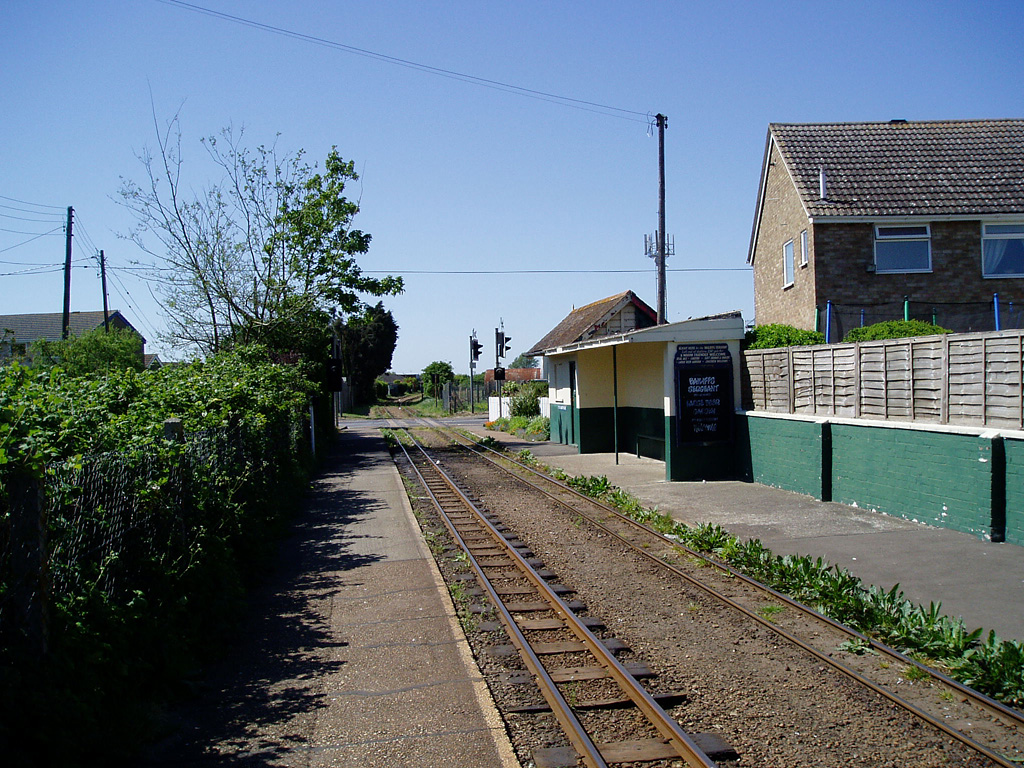
- A view of St Mary's Bay station looking towards New Romney

General information
- Location: St Mary's Bay, Folkestone & Hythe; England
- Grid reference: TR087277
- System: Station on heritage railway
- Manager: RHDR
- Platforms: 2

Key dates
- 1927: Opened
- 1940: closed
- 1946: reopened
Location

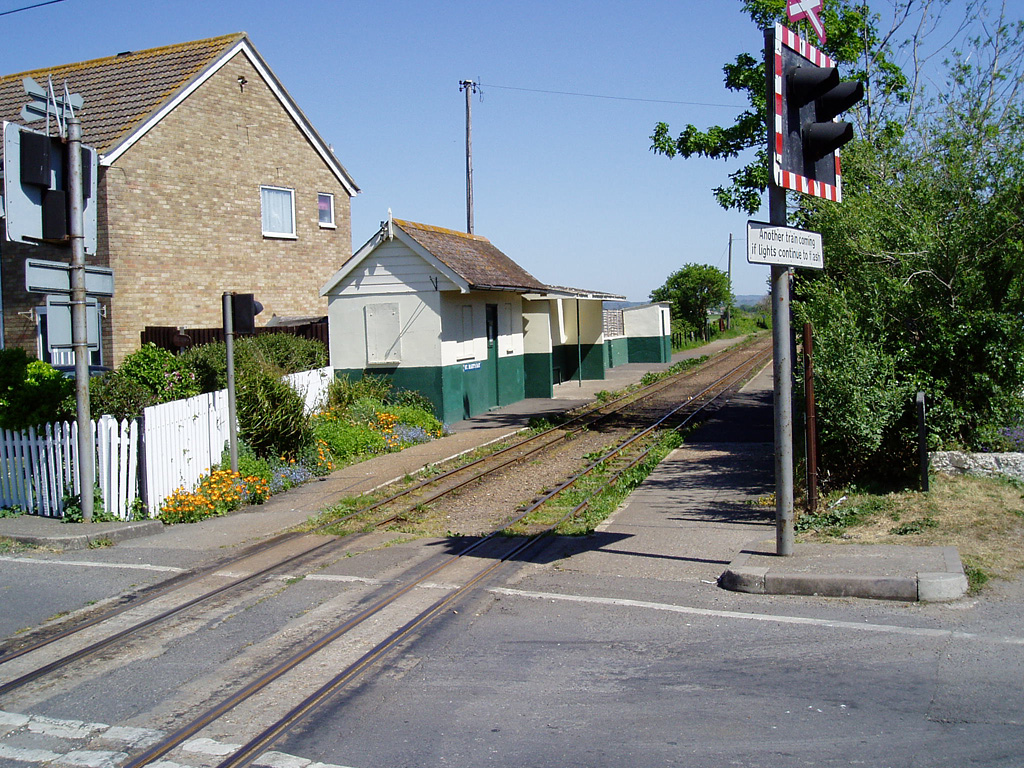
A view of St. Mary's Bay railway station looking towards Dymchurch

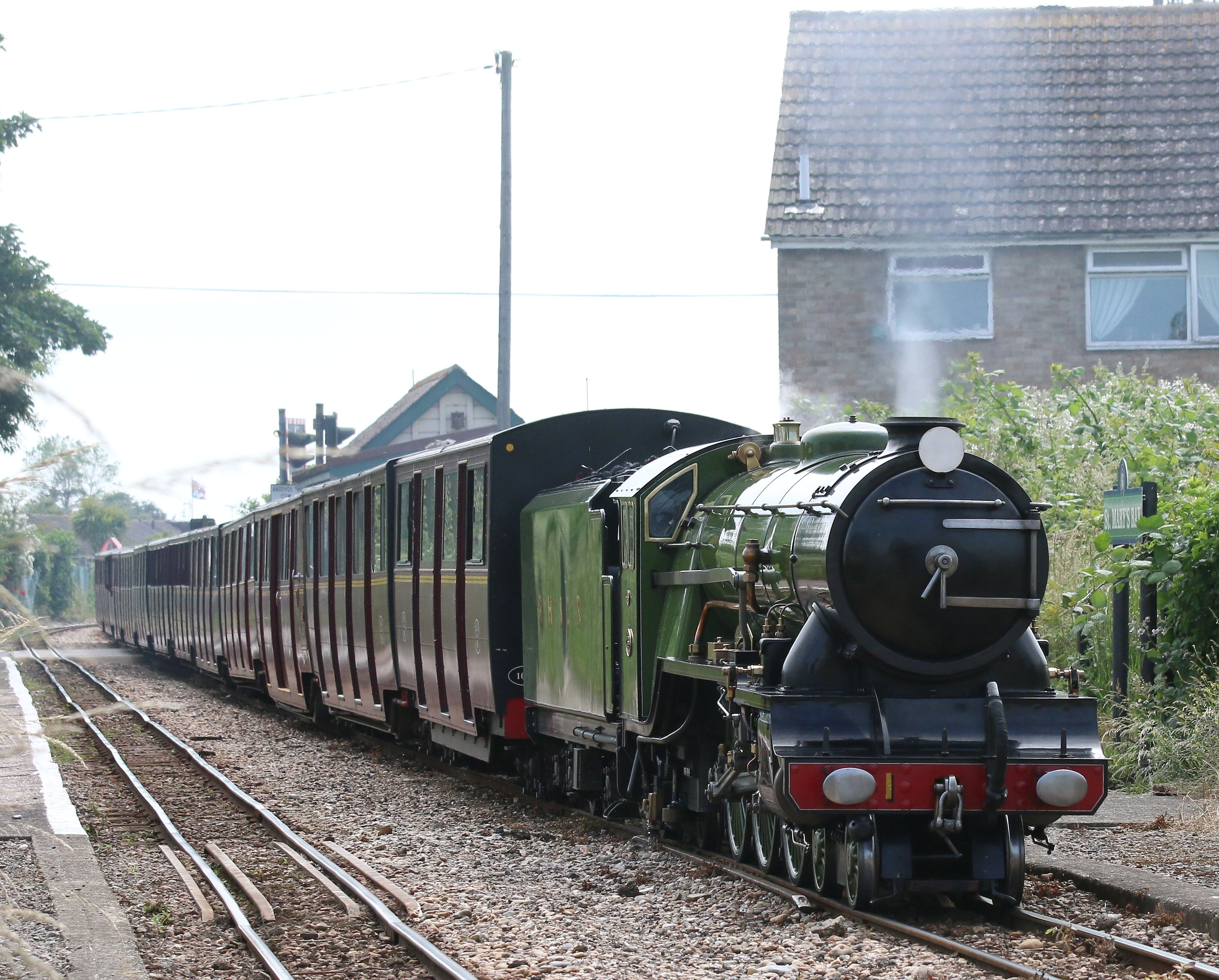
Romney, Hythe & Dymchurch Railway No. 1 "Green Goddess" storms through St. Marys station non-stop with the 2.15pm departure from Dungeness

St. Mary's Bay railway station is a small station in St Mary's Bay, Kent, England, between the larger stations of New Romney and Dymchurch, on the Romney, Hythe and Dymchurch Railway.

Situated off Jefferstone Lane the station has two platforms, one of which (the 'down' platform) is without station buildings. The other (the 'up' platform) has three buildings. The first is a booking office and when the station is staffed, a passenger waiting room, which also houses the control equipment for the adjacent level crossing. This building is joined to an open-fronted platform shelter with passenger seating. The third building is a toilet block, although this has been out of use for some years.

The station is currently used largely by local residents and passengers alighting here for the sandy beach.

Also in St Mary's Bay, about a quarter of a mile further north down Dunstall Lane is the now-closed Golden Sands Halt railway station, formerly used by the Maddieson's Golden Sands holiday camp.

== History ==
When first opened this station was named "Holiday Camp" after a nearby camp run by Allnatt Limited - later to become 'The School Journey Centre'. It has also been known as "Jesson" (Jesson Lane being the former name for Jefferstone Lane) and "Holiday Camp Jesson". Since 1946 it has been known as "St Mary's Bay" apart from a period from the early 1980s until the end of 2000 when it was renamed "Jefferstone Lane". In 2000/2001 the station was refurbished in the current colour scheme of green and cream. A small garden was also established by the booking office.

Until the end of the 1990s this station was fully staffed during the summer period. Since then it has been staffed only on special event days or when surplus staff have been available. Generally passengers are now expected to purchase their tickets at their destination.

Although no longer a block post for train control purposes, it was able to be used as such until 2000. The station had a single-aspect signal installation in the 'starter signal' position on the 'down' platform. The one displayable aspect was 'danger' (red). This was unusual in a non-block station. This signal had the outward appearance of being two-aspect, but this was an illusion, as one apparent signal aspect was in fact the repeater flashing light to indicate to train drivers that the adjacent level crossing (with Jefferstone Lane) signals had operated correctly to stop road traffic.

A short distance south of St Mary's Bay station a signal box was originally erected to control movements in and out of sidings provided to serve Allnatt's holiday camp, and is marked as such on the title deeds for this part of the station site. When it fell into disuse (and in fact whether it was actually used at all) is unknown. No trace of it can be found today.

The station was refurbished and repainted in 2009 by a small group of volunteers, helped by the railway's paid staff, with the aim of the station being opened on special events with small, but appropriate, photographic displays within the booking office. This has already happened during the 2008 and 2009 "Home Guard" weekends.

Once the upgrading work on the level crossing has been completed, which involves the installation of level crossing barriers, there are plans to establish the station as a 'Haven for wildlife'. This will include the building of a dead hedge on the up platform, from the end of the toilet block to the Dymchurch end of the platform. Also the garden area will be replanted to encourage local wildlife along with the current assortment of bird feeders and bird boxes that are already present.

The station became a request stop in the early 2010s.

Preceding station	Heritage railways	Following station
Warren Halt towards Dungeness	Romney, Hythe & Dymchurch Railway	Dymchurch towards Hythe
Former service
Warren Halt Line and station open towards Dungeness	Romney, Hythe & Dymchurch Railway	Golden Sands Halt Line open, station closed towards Hythe
