= John Bunting =

John Bunting may refer to:

- John Bunting (American football) (born 1950), former head football coach at the University of North Carolina at Chapel Hill and former NFL player
- John Bunting (public servant) (1918–1995), Australian public servant and Australian High Commissioner to the UK
- John Bunting (MP) (c. 1480–1544/46), British Member of Parliament for New Romney, Kent
- John Bunting (sculptor) (1927–2002), British sculptor and teacher
- John Bunting (loyalist) (born c. 1967), Northern Irish loyalist leader
- John Bunting (born 1966), Australian serial killer and ringleader of the Snowtown murders
- Jack Bunting (John Baden Bunting, 1900–1951), English football goalkeeper
