= Andrew Colyn =

Andrew Colyn (died c. 1402), of New Romney, Kent, was an English Member of Parliament (MP).

He was a Member of the Parliament of England for New Romney in May 1382 and 1393.

Parliament of England
Preceded by John Ellis; John Salerne	Member of Parliament for New Romney; 1393; With: Robert Geffe	Succeeded by unrecorded unrecorded
