= James Tiece =

English politician

James Tiece (died ca. 1423), of New Romney, Kent, was an English politician.

Tiece was a Member of Parliament for New Romney in February 1383, April 1384, January 1390, November 1390 and 1417.
