= John Roger (died 1415) =

English Member of Parliament

John Roger (died 1414/15), of New Romney, Kent, was an English Member of Parliament for New Romney in 1407.
