= William Child (MP) =

English politician

William Child (died c. 1398), of New Romney, Kent, was an English politician.

== Family ==
Child may have been the son of Thomas Child of New Romney and Margaret Child née Spite, a daughter of William Spite.

== Career ==
He was a member (MP) of the parliament of England for New Romney in January 1377, 1381, October 1383, 1385 and 1395.
