= Richard Gibson (MP) =

16th-century English politician

Richard Gibson (by 1480–1534), of London and New Romney, Kent, was an English politician.

He was a member of parliament (MP) for New Romney in 1529. He was also jurat of New Romney, commissioner for sewers of Kent, city bailiff of Southwark, and warden and master of the Worshipful Company of Merchant Taylors.
