= Clitheroe (disambiguation) =

Clitheroe is a town in Lancashire, England.

Clitheroe may also refer to:

- Clitheroe (constituency), a former constituency centred around the town
- Clitheroe (surname), a surname
- Clitheroe F.C., a football club
