= Edmund Huchoun =

Edmund Huchoun (died c. 1395), of New Romney, Kent, was an English Member of Parliament (MP).

Edmund was married with one son, Peter Huchoun.

He was a Member of the Parliament of England for New Romney in October 1382 and November 1390.
