= Golden Sands Halt railway station =

Disused railway station in Kent, England

Coordinates: 51°00′57″N 0°58′47″E

Golden Sands Halt
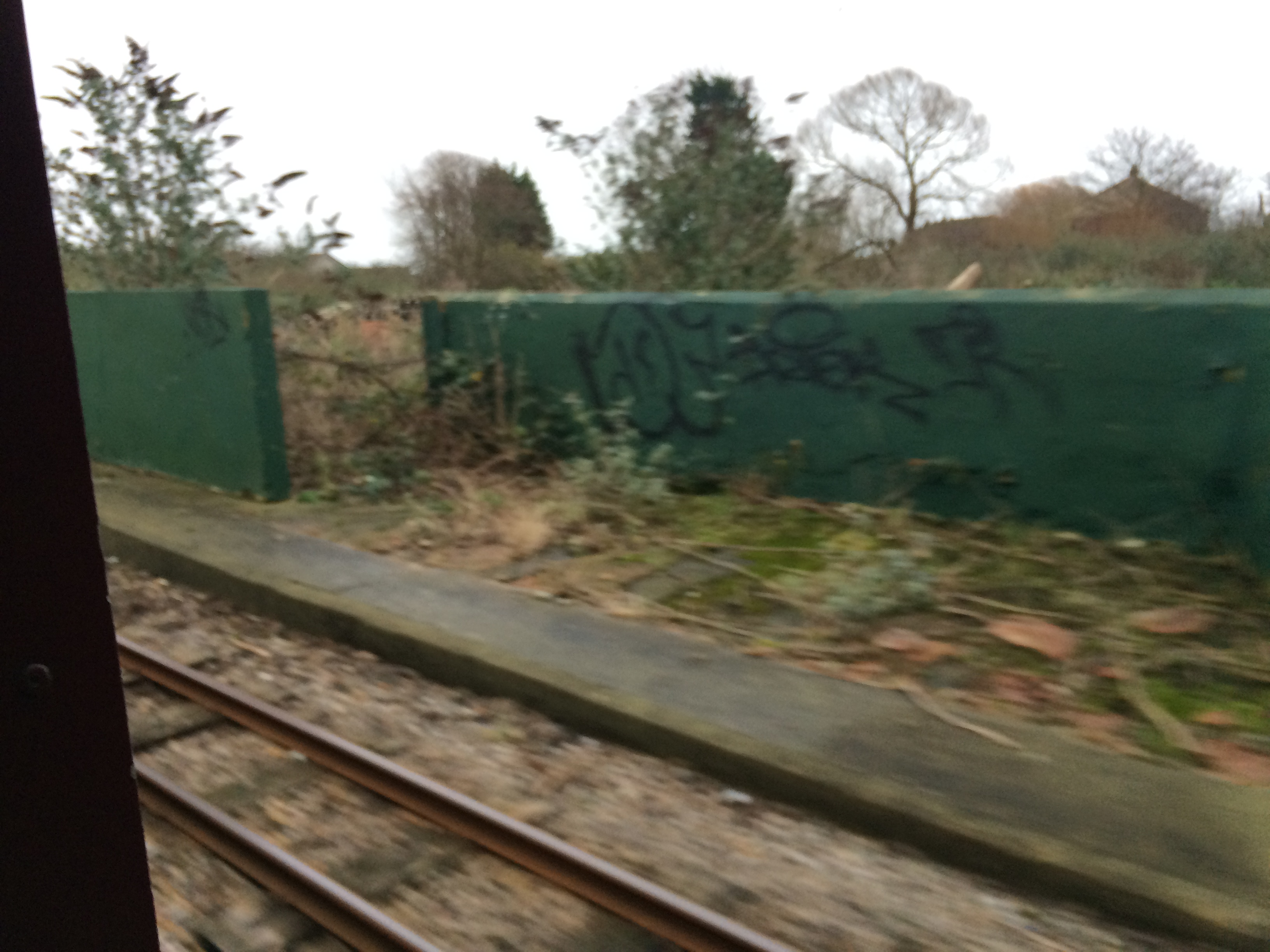
- A view of the disused station platform, taken from a passing train in 2015.

General information
- Location: St Mary's Bay, Folkestone & Hythe; England
- Platforms: 1

Other information
- Status: Disused

History
- Original company: RHDR

Key dates
- 1948: Opened
- 1995: Station closed to passengers
- 2016: Station demolished
Location

Golden Sands Halt railway station was a private station on the Romney, Hythe and Dymchurch Railway in St Mary's Bay, Kent, England. In the 1990s it was briefly renamed Reunion Halt.

== History ==
Trains ran past this location for some 21 years before the private Golden Sands Halt opened in the summer of 1948. The post-war boom in south coast holiday camp tourism had brought huge demand to the area, and the Golden Sands holiday camp (located down Dunstall Lane and backing onto the railway line) saw the potential for entertaining its guests by the simple provision of a station on the existing railway line. The camp, originally owned and built by Robert Briggs, was sold to Maddiesons in the late 1950s.

The nature of British holiday making changed greatly over the ensuing decades, but Golden Sands Holiday Camp continued to evolve, and its private railway station remained a feature, as a request stop for service trains on the mainline.

By the early 1980s use of the station had been considerably reduced, and it was largely only special train services (provided for campers) which made use of the station. Golden Sands Halt appeared to have reached the end of its life, and indeed the 'camp' side of the station became (in the late 1980s) a storage area for the private collection of vintage fire engines owned by a director of the holiday camp; however, the 1990s saw the holiday camp enter into new ownership, with a revival of use of the private station. The new owners renamed the camp, and the station followed suit, becoming Reunion Halt.

== Closure ==
The somewhat patchy life of this station is explained by the fact that it is in private ownership, with its fortunes always being totally bound up with those of the holiday camp, together with the fact that St Mary's Bay Station is located just a quarter of a mile further south, and is a fully open public station for all. With a sharp decline in the local holiday-making industry, the station closed in 1995.

== Present situation ==
Today the Reunion campsite has been closed and the site is undergoing re-development as a housing estate. By the mid-2000s all of the buildings at the campsite had been demolished including the original 1948 station. Its single short platform (on the down line) was the sole survivor, and could still just be made out from passing trains, with a concrete surrounding wall, and a wooden gate providing access to and from the derelict campsite, as a reminder of a former era of holiday making. In early 2016 the platform and retaining wall were broken up by developers, removing the final traces of the station, in preparation for the start of construction of houses on the site.

Preceding station	Heritage railways	Following station
Former service
St Mary's Bay Line and station open towards Dungeness	Romney, Hythe & Dymchurch Railway	Dymchurch Line and station open towards Hythe
