= William Holyngbroke =

English politician

William Holingbroke, alias Holyngbourne (died c. 1400), of New Romney, Kent, was an English politician.

He was a Member (MP) of the Parliament of England for New Romney in 1381, October 1383, November 1384, February 1388 and September 1388.
