= John Cheseman =

Member of the Parliament of England

John Cheseman (died 1592) of New Romney, Kent, was an English solicitor.

He was a Member of Parliament for New Romney in October 1553, April 1554 and 1559 and Mayor of New Romney in 1563–4, 1573–4, 1579–80, 1584–5 and 1591–2.
