= Simon Padyham =

16th-century English politician

Simon Padyham (by 1515 – 1568 or later), of New Romney, Kent, was an English politician.

He was a member of parliament (MP) for New Romney in March 1553 and 1558. The son of John Padyham, who was bailiff and jurat of Romney, he was also bailiff, chamberlain, and jurat to that town.
