= John Ive (died 1409) =

English politician

John Ive (died 1409), of New Romney, Kent, was an English politician.

He was a Member (MP) of the Parliament of England for New Romney in January 1390 and 1402. He was also the common clerk and jurat of the aforementioned town.
