= St Mary's Bay, Kent =

Village in Kent, England

Coordinates: 51.0105°N 0.9771°E

St Mary's Bay
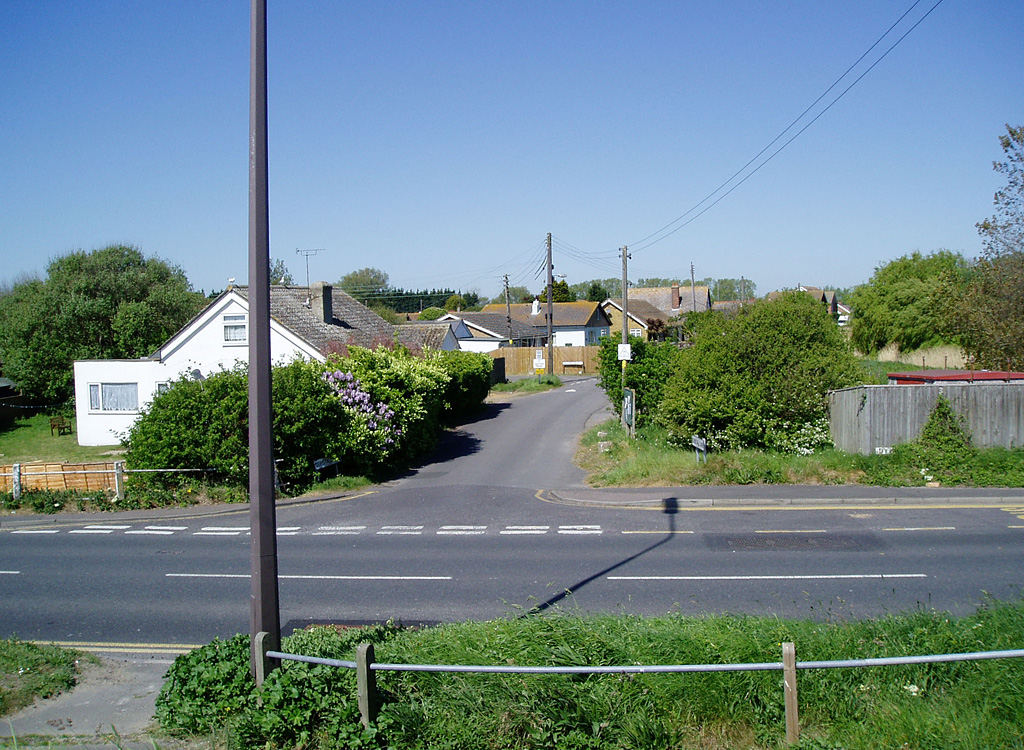
- The entrance to Dunstall Lane

- Location within Kent
- Population: 2,819 (parish, 2011 Census)
- OS grid reference: TR089276
- Civil parish: St Mary in the Marsh
- District: Folkestone and Hythe
- Shire county: Kent
- Region: South East
- Country: England
- Sovereign state: United Kingdom
- Post town: Romney Marsh
- Postcode district: TN29 0
- Dialling code: 01797/01303
- Police: Kent
- Fire: Kent
- Ambulance: South East Coast
- UK Parliament: Folkestone and Hythe
- Website: Official website

St Mary's Bay, also known as The Bay, is a coastal village in Kent, England. Situated on Romney Marsh, St Mary's Bay has a long sandy beach which stretches north to Dymchurch and south to Littlestone-on-Sea. It has a station on the Romney, Hythe and Dymchurch Railway.

== History ==
During the 1950s and 1960s, St Mary's Bay was a popular destination for vacationers. 'The Bay' had a number of holiday camps, among them Maddieson's Golden Sands at Dunstall Lane, the School Journey Centre at Jefferstone Lane, and the Rugby Club camp on the opposite (sea) side of the A259 main road between Jefferstone Lane and Taylor's Lane. The School Journey Center closed at the end of the 1970s, and the site is now occupied by a housing estate. Also at St Mary's Bay was the Sands Holiday Motel and accompanying Bahia Bar, sited on the seafront roughly opposite the turning to Jefferstone Lane on the A259. The hotel and bar were demolished after being badly damaged in the Great Storm of 1987.

St Mary's Bay was the site of a home for mentally handicapped children. Known as Pirates Spring and located on Coast Drive close to the beach, the home was run by the National Society for Mentally Handicapped Children (now Mencap) and had the actor Brian Rix among its patrons. After the facility closed in the 1980s the building housed a hotel and country club in the 1990s. The Springs Community now provides sheltered housing accommodation for people with the special needs associated with autism spectrum disorders.

== Former businesses ==
At one time 'The Bay' was home to a number of shops, but these are now reduced in number. The Post Office is located in Teelin Close down Jefferstone Lane, having previously been sited in a building that was part of the School Journey Centre at the top of Jefferstone Lane at the junction with the A259.

There were two Newsagents, one at the top of Taylors Lane alongside the former St Mary's Bay Garage, and the other, St Mary's Bay Superstore, down Jefferstone Lane. The former has now closed and become a private house. St Mary's Bay Superstore has now become the Beachside Stores, which is a general newsagents and the biggest shop in the area, after Sainsbury's (New Romney).

Also down Jefferstone Lane is Foords electrical retailers. During the 1970s St Mary's Bay had a small supermarket situated at the top of Jefferstone Lane opposite the previous Post Office site. Known as the 'Mini-Market', it closed at the end of the 1970s. The building remained empty until the 1990s, when it was pulled down and a new housing development, Jesson Close, built on the site. 'The Bay' was host to both a butcher's and a baker's, but both are gone now; the site down Jefferstone Lane had houses built on it in the late 1980s in a development named Old Bakery Close.

In between what was once 'Harry's Newsagents' and the post office was a restaurant called Betty's Restaurant. This closed and was reopened as a pharmacy which closed soon afterwards.

== Education ==
'The Bay' has a small nursery school in Jefferstone Lane next door to the church. Children older than nursery school age go to schools outside St Mary's Bay, generally Dymchurch Junior School. Some later attend the Marsh Academy in New Romney, and some travel to schools further afield.

== Religion ==
St Mary's Bay has a small modern Anglican church of All Saints, located on Jefferstone Lane. It is part of the parish of St Mary in the Marsh, where there is a much older church.

== Other facilities ==
'The Bay' is the home to an Army Cadet Force Detachment, located down Jefferstone Lane just over the RH & DR railway crossing adjacent to a caravan park.

St Mary's Bay has a modern village hall located opposite the site of The Bailiffs Sergeant pub on land that was originally part of the School Journey Centre holiday camp. Previously the town hall was located in one of the holiday camp's old buildings; the building remained in use for some years after the rest of the holiday camp had been demolished.

At the end of Jefferstone Lane is a large well-kept recreation ground with a pavilion for sporting events.

== Famous residents ==
St Mary's Bay was the home of actor Larry Martyn, who lived down Jefferstone Lane in Old Bakery Close until he died in 1994.

The children's author E. Nesbit, author of The Railway Children, lived at the Jolly Boat with her second husband, Captain Tucker, living in the Long boat conjoined by an internal walkway in St Mary's Bay between the two World Wars and she is buried in the churchyard at nearby St Mary in the Marsh.
