= John Gardener (died 1402) =

Member of the Parliament of England

John Gardener (died 1402), of New Romney, Kent was a Member of Parliament for New Romney in 1395, 1399 and 1401.
