= John Maffey =

John Maffey may refer to:

- John Maffey, 1st Baron Rugby (1877–1969), British civil servant and diplomat
- John Maffey (MP) (fl.1414)
