= Clement Baker =

English politician

Clement Baker (by 1470 – 1516), of New Romney, Kent, was an English politician.

He was a Member of Parliament (MP) for New Romney in 1512 and 1515, and was chamberlain, commissioner of subsidy, and jurat of the town. He was also bailiff to Yarmouth.
