= Lunceford =

Lunceford is a surname. Notable people with the surname include:

- David Lunceford (1934–2009), American football player
- Jimmie Lunceford (1902–1947), American jazz alto saxophonist and bandleader in the swing era
- Laurence Lunceford, English mayor and MP
- Simon Lunceford (died c. 1390), Member of the Parliament of England
