= Colyn =

Colyn is a given name and surname. Notable people with the name include:

- Alexander Colyn (1527–1612), Flemish sculptor
- Andrew Colyn (died c. 1402), English Member of Parliament
- Colyn Fischer (born 1977), American violinist
- Simon Colyn (born 2002), Canadian soccer player

== See also ==
- Colin (given name)
- Colin (surname)
