= Tadlowe =

Tadlowe is a surname. Notable people with the surname include:

- William Tadlowe (by 1495–1556), English politician
- George Tadlowe, English politician
