= Stephen Adam (MP) =

Member of the Parliament of England

Stephen Adam (died 1405) of New Romney was an English politician who was MP for an unknown constituency (probably New Romney) in 1376. History of Parliament Online theorizes that he was the father of John Adam.
