= Simon Lunceford =

English politician

Simon Lunceford (died c. 1390), of Rye, Sussex and New Romney, Kent, was an English politician.

He was a member (MP) of the parliament of England for Rye in 1381 and for New Romney in 1386.
