= John Maffey (MP) =

Member of the Parliament of England

John Maffey or Massey (fl. 1414) of New Romney, Kent, was an English Member of Parliament for New Romney in November 1414.
