= The Marsh Academy =

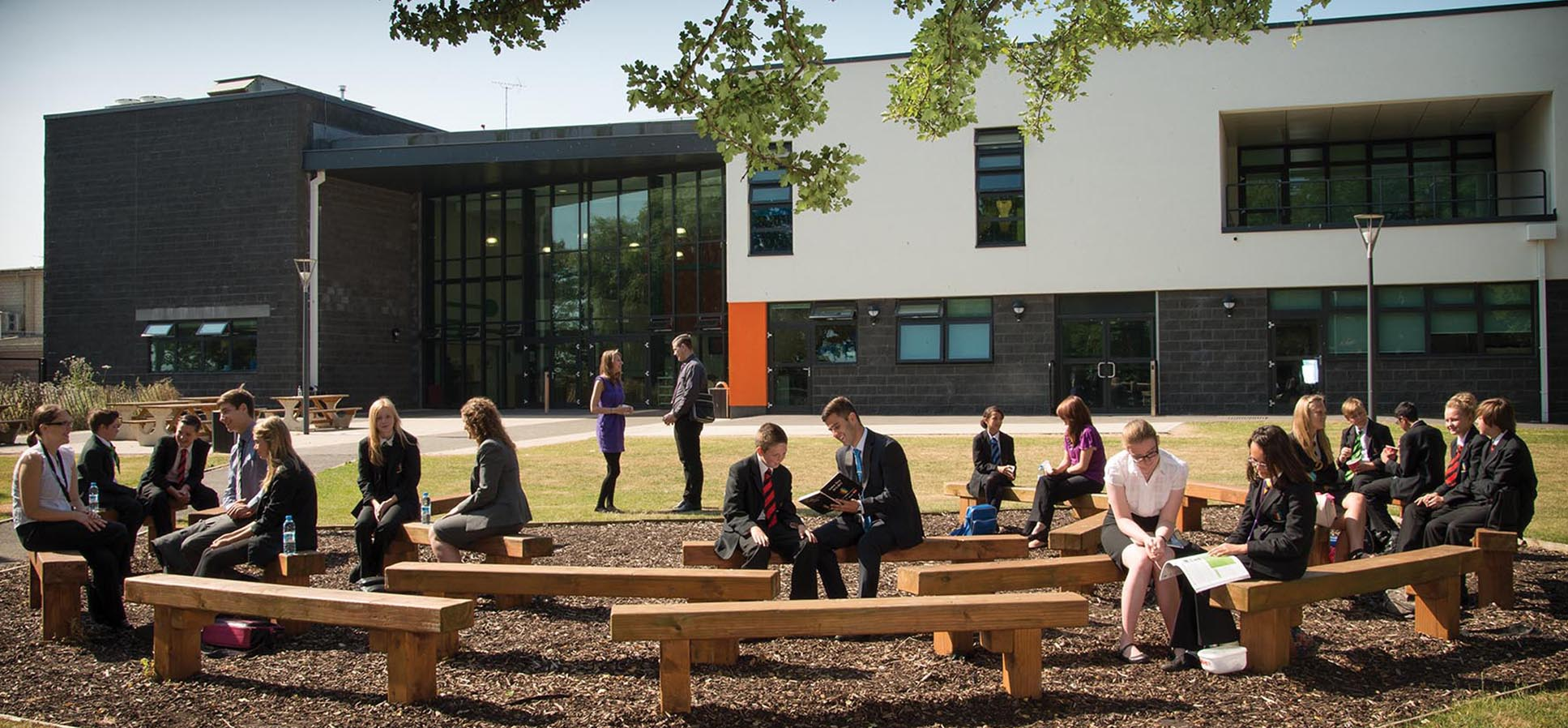

Location
- Station Road; New Romney, Kent, TN28 8BB; England; 50°59′13″N 0°56′49″E

Information
- Former name: Southlands Community Comprehensive School
- Type: Academy
- Established: 1588
- Trust: Sponsor-led, The Skinners' Company
- Department for Education URN: 135290 Tables
- Ofsted: Reports
- Principal: Shaun Simmons
- Gender: Coeducational
- Age: 11 to 19
- Website: marshacademy.org.uk

The Marsh Academy, formerly Southlands Community Comprehensive School, is a non-selective secondary school in New Romney, Kent, England. The school is supported by the Skinners’ Company.

Students attend from all over Romney Marsh.

== History ==
The school was established in 1588 in the parish of St Nicholas by John Southland, a resident of New Romney. It was established as a school for the poor and endowed as a permanent institution by his will of 1610.

The John Southland Trust scheme was renewed from 22 December 1916 and confirmed by parliament in 1923 "to go to poor children".

From 7 September 1977 until 24 July 2015, the Romney, Hythe and Dymchurch Railway provided school trains to transport children to and from the Academy. The service was finally withdrawn due to falling usage.

On 1 September 2007 the school's name was changed to the current name, The Marsh Academy.

== Description ==
A school serving 1000 children in an isolated rural coastal location.
