= New Romney Town Hall =

Municipal building in New Romney, Kent, England

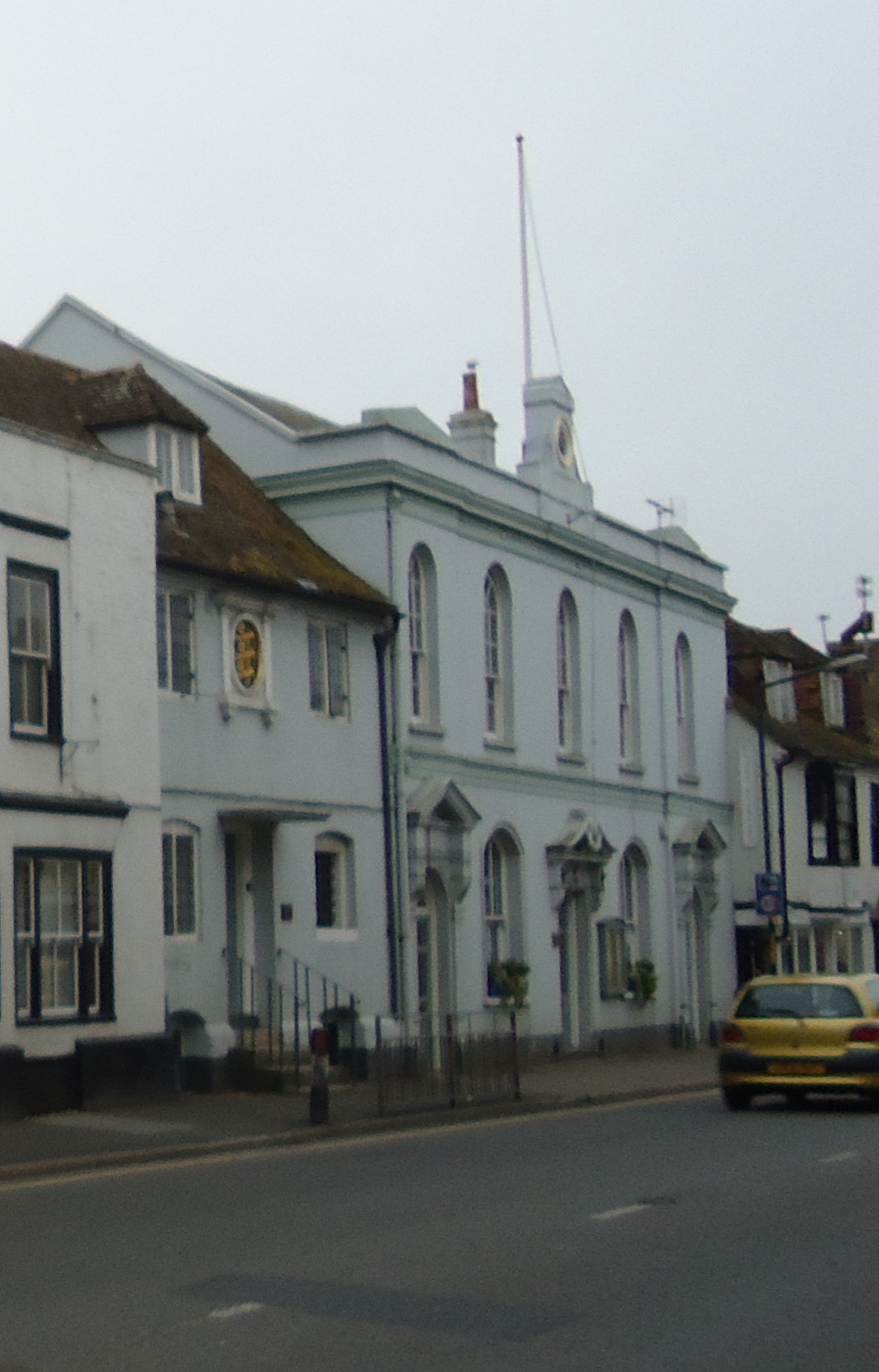
- New Romney Town Hall

- Shown in Kent
- 50.9855°N 0.9395°E
- Location: High Street, New Romney

History
- Built: 1702

Site notes
- Architectural style: Italianate style

Listed Building – Grade II
- Official name: The Town Hall
- Designated: 28 August 1951
- Reference no.: 1068989

New Romney Town Hall is a municipal structure in the High Street, New Romney, Kent, England. The structure, which is the meeting place of New Romney Town Council, is a Grade II listed building.

== History ==
The building, which was originally commissioned by the local bailiff as a market hall, was designed in the Italianate style and was completed in 1702. The design involved a symmetrical main frontage with five bays facing onto the High Street with the end bays slightly projected forward; it was originally arcaded on the ground floor so that markets could be held. A lock-up for incarcerating petty criminals was erected to the east of the town hall in the mid-18th century and the town hall was given a new stucco façade in the early 19th century. Internally, the principal room was a courtroom on the first floor.

New Romney had a very small electorate and a dominant patron, Sir Edward Dering, 8th Baronet of Surrenden House, which meant it was recognised by the UK Parliament as a rotten borough. Its right to elect members of parliament was removed by the Reform Act 1832. The town hall was the venue for the inquest into the death of Louisa Kidder-Staples in August 1867: her step-mother, Frances Kidder, was subsequently found guilty of murdering her and became the last woman to be publicly hanged in the UK.

The borough council was reformed under the Municipal Corporations Act 1883. The ground floor of the town hall was infilled in 1884: following these alterations, the central bay featured a doorway with an architrave flanked by brackets supporting an open pediment while the outer bays contained doorways with fanlights flanked by pilasters and brackets supporting triangular pediments. On the ground floor, the bays on either side of the central bay were fenestrated by segmental windows while, on the first floor, all the bays were fenestrated by round headed windows. At roof level there was a cornice, a parapet and a central pediment containing a roundel inscribed with the town coat of arms. The courtroom was adapted to serve as the council chamber for the reformed borough.

Visitors to the town hall in the 20th century included the former Prime Minister of Australia, Sir Robert Menzies, who toured the area shortly after he was appointed Lord Warden of the Cinque Ports in 1966.

The town hall continued to serve as the headquarters of the borough council for much of the 20th century, but ceased to be the local seat of government when the enlarged Folkestone and Hythe District Council was formed in 1974. Instead, it became the meeting place of New Romney Town Council. A local history museum was also established in the town hall: items acquired for the collection included an example of the flag of the Lord Warden of the Cinque Ports, a set of imperial measures, typically held by local authorities to ensure tradesmen comply with the Weights and Measures Act 1824, and a mid-19th century iron box containing the minute books and other important documents of the former borough.
