= Thomas Godfrey (MP for Winchelsea and New Romney) =

English Member of Parliament

Thomas Godfrey (3 January 1586 – 1664), of Halling, Kent; formerly of Winchelsea, Sussex; later of Hoddiford, Sellinge, Kent, was an English Member of Parliament.

He was a Member (MP) of the Parliament of England for Winchelsea in 1614 and for New Romney in 1628 and April 1640.
