= Richard Clitheroe =

Richard Clitheroe or Clitherow may refer to:

- Richard Clitheroe (died 1420), MP for Kent
- Richard Clitheroe (died c. 1463), MP for New Romney
- Richard Clitheroe, see Socialist Health Association
- Richard Clitherow (1902–1947), MP
- Richard Clitherow (bishop)
