= William Tadlowe =

16th-century English politician

William Tadlowe (by 1495 – 1556), of New Romney, Kent, was an English politician.

He was a Member of Parliament (MP) for New Romney in 1539, 1542, 1547 and October 1553. He was also bailiff, chamberlain, and jurat to New Romney, and bailiff to Yarmouth.
