= Robert Paris (MP) =

16th-century English politician

Robert Paris (by 1487 – 1550?), of New Romney, Kent, was an English politician.

He was a Member of Parliament (MP) for New Romney in 1523. He was jurat in that town from 1508 and bailiff to Yarmouth in 1522.
