= St Mary in the Marsh =

Village in Kent, England

Coordinates: 51.0142°N 0.9424°E

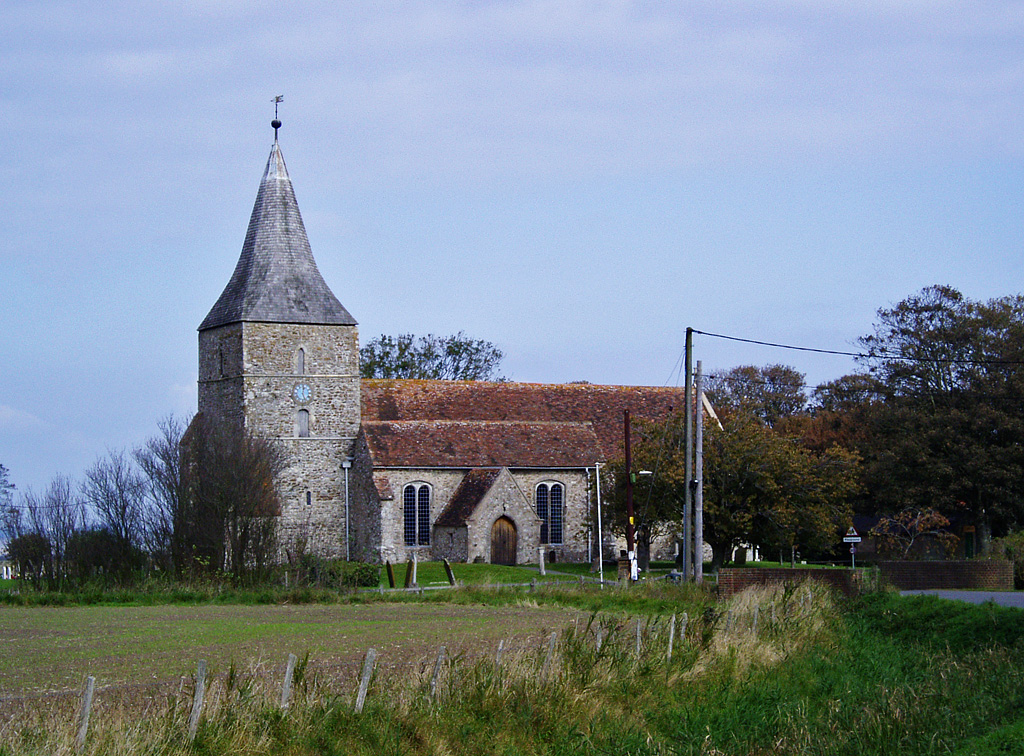
- The church of St Mary the Virgin, St Mary in the Marsh

- Location within Kent
- Population: 2,819 (2011)
- District: Folkestone and Hythe
- Shire county: Kent
- Region: South East
- Country: England
- Sovereign state: United Kingdom
- Post town: Romney Marsh
- Postcode district: TN29
- Police: Kent
- Fire: Kent
- Ambulance: South East Coast
- UK Parliament: Folkestone and Hythe

St Mary in the Marsh is a village and civil parish near New Romney in Kent, England, situated in the heart of Romney Marsh in one of its least densely populated areas, with most local amenities available 3 miles away in New Romney or St Mary's Bay at 2 miles. The village centre consists of about forty homes, a few scattered farms and The Star Inn, along with the church of St Mary the Virgin and the St Marys Hut, now closed. St Mary's Bay is also in the parish. A group of villagers have established a charity "St Mary in the Marsh Project Fund" with the aim of building a new community hub.

== History ==
It is probable that there was a Saxon church on the site originally known as "Siwold's Circe". This was superseded after the Norman invasion by a stone built church with a splendid three tier tower of Kentish ragstone. The oldest parts of the church date to about 1133 AD. The chancel was extended in about 1220 AD and the spire added around 1450 AD. Inside is a plaque commemorating Edith Nesbit, author of The Railway Children, who lived at St. Mary's Bay and is buried in the churchyard. There are many interesting features of the building which warrant a visit.

St Mary in the Marsh is surrounded by the stark beauty of the marshes and the open landscapes of rich farmland.

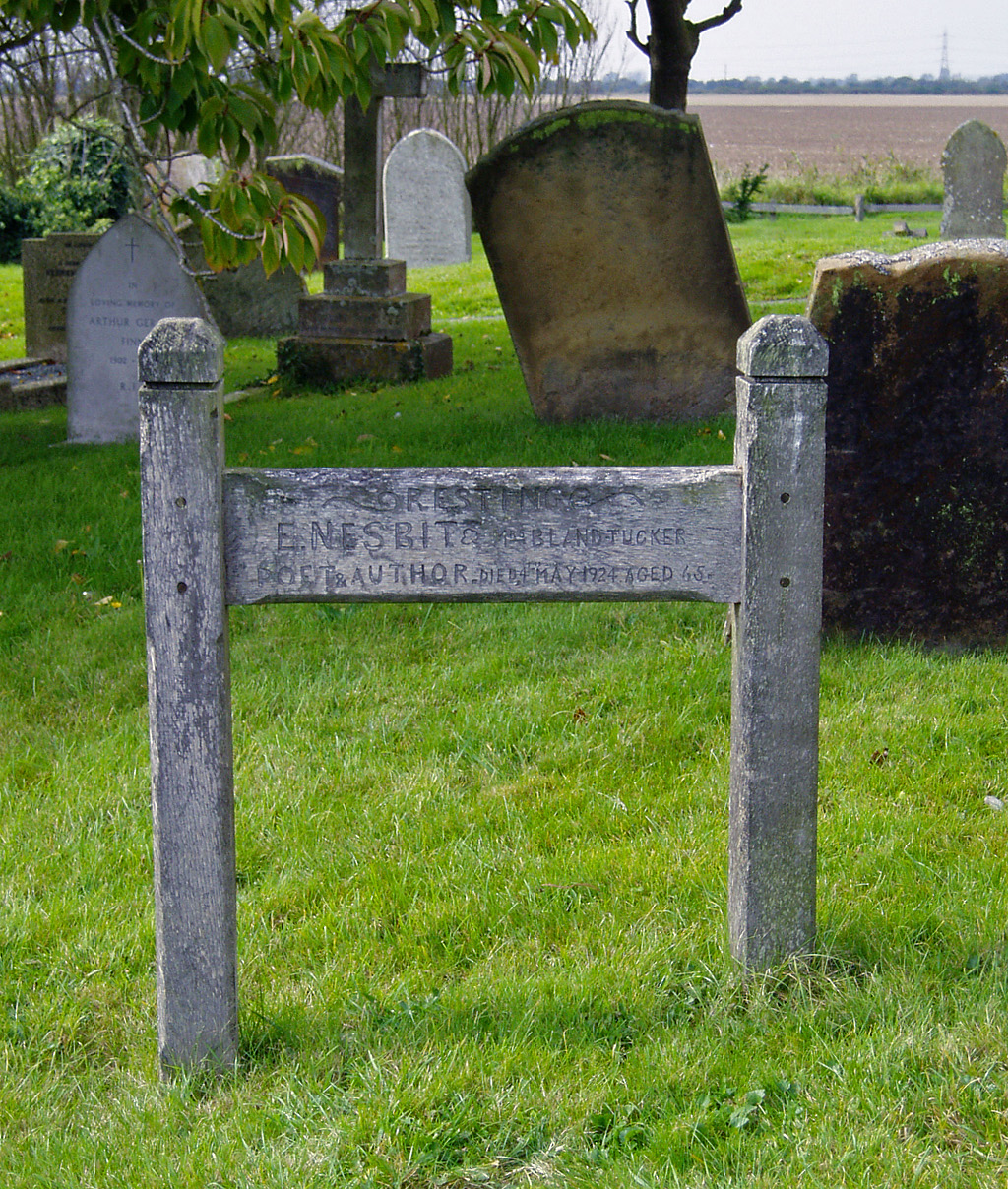
The grave of E. Nesbit, author of The Railway Children, in the churchyard of St Mary in the Marsh church

The playwright, actor and composer Noël Coward lived for a time in Star Cottage, next to the inn.
