= John Bunting (MP) =

16th-century English politician

John Bunting (c. 1480–1544/46), of New Romney, Kent, was an English politician.

He was a Member of Parliament (MP) for New Romney in 1529 and 1536. He was also chamberlain and jurat in New Romney, and bailiff to Yarmouth. His son was Richard Bunting.
