= Dymchurch railway station =

Railway station in Dymchurch, England

Coordinates: 51°01′31″N 0°59′27″E

Dymchurch
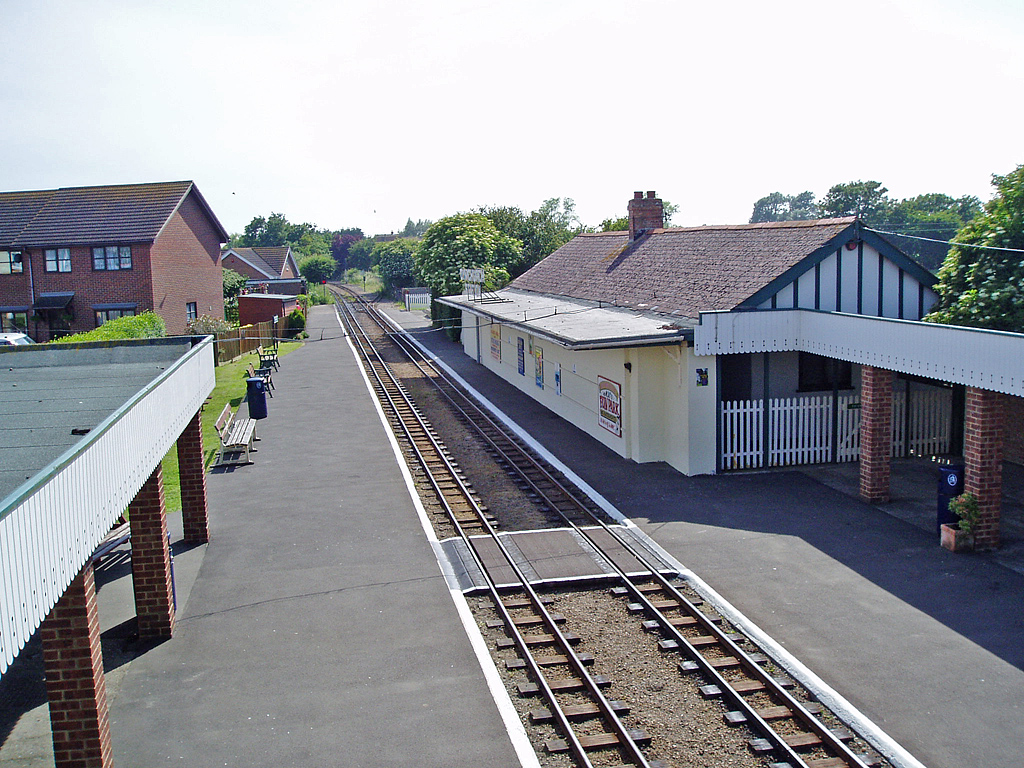
- Dymchurch railway station looking from the footbridge towards St Marys Bay

General information
- Location: Dymchurch, Folkestone & Hythe; England
- Grid reference: TR098293
- System: Station on heritage railway
- Manager: RHDR
- Platforms: 2

Key dates
- 16 July 1927: Opened
- 1940: closed
- 1946: reopened
Location

Dymchurch railway station is on the Romney, Hythe and Dymchurch Railway in Kent, England. It is five miles (eight km) south of Hythe, and surrounded by flat countryside.

The station opened on 16 July 1927 as Dymchurch (Marshlands), to distinguish it from a nearby station called Burmarsh for East Dymchurch and later as Dymchurch Bay.

The station has two platforms connected by a footbridge. On the 'up' platform there is a shelter and a station master's house. On the 'down' platform is a station building incorporating a booking office and staff room, a shop selling souvenirs and refreshments, and a women's toilet. The men's toilets are in the supporting pillars of the footbridge, although only that on the 'down' platform is in use.

The station is a tourist destination, largely for the sandy beaches nearby, the holiday arcades and an amusement park. It has three staff during the summer (one only, out of season). It is a block station for train control purposes.

== History ==
Originally larger, the 1920s station had three platforms (two through platforms and a bay platform) with an overall roof, a signal box, a turntable, and a mainline crossover to allow shuttle trains from New Romney. These never happened, and the turntable was removed in the 1930s. A second crossover was installed before the war and shuttles worked between Dymchurch and Hythe via Burmarsh Road. The signalbox was removed in the 1960s, and the remaining four switches bolted in the normal position, primitive colour-light signals being worked by domestic light switches from the booking office for normal block operations. They were not interlocked with the points, or each other. These signals were subsequently removed.

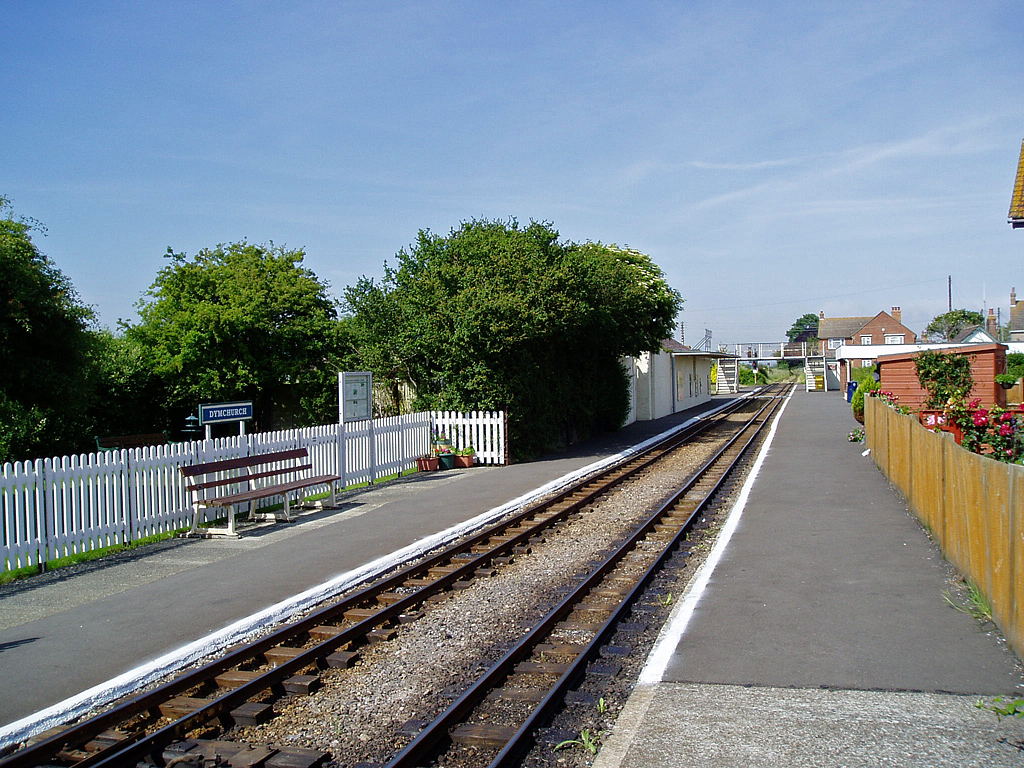
Dymchurch railway station looking towards Burmarsh Road

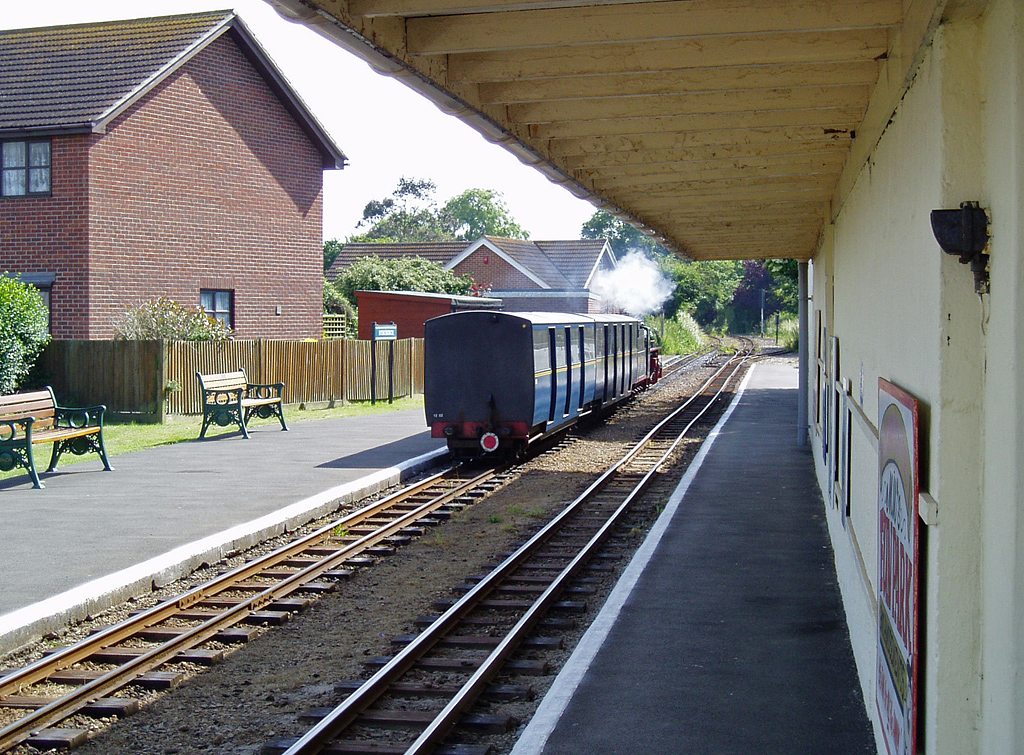
Dymchurch railway station looking towards St Marys Bay

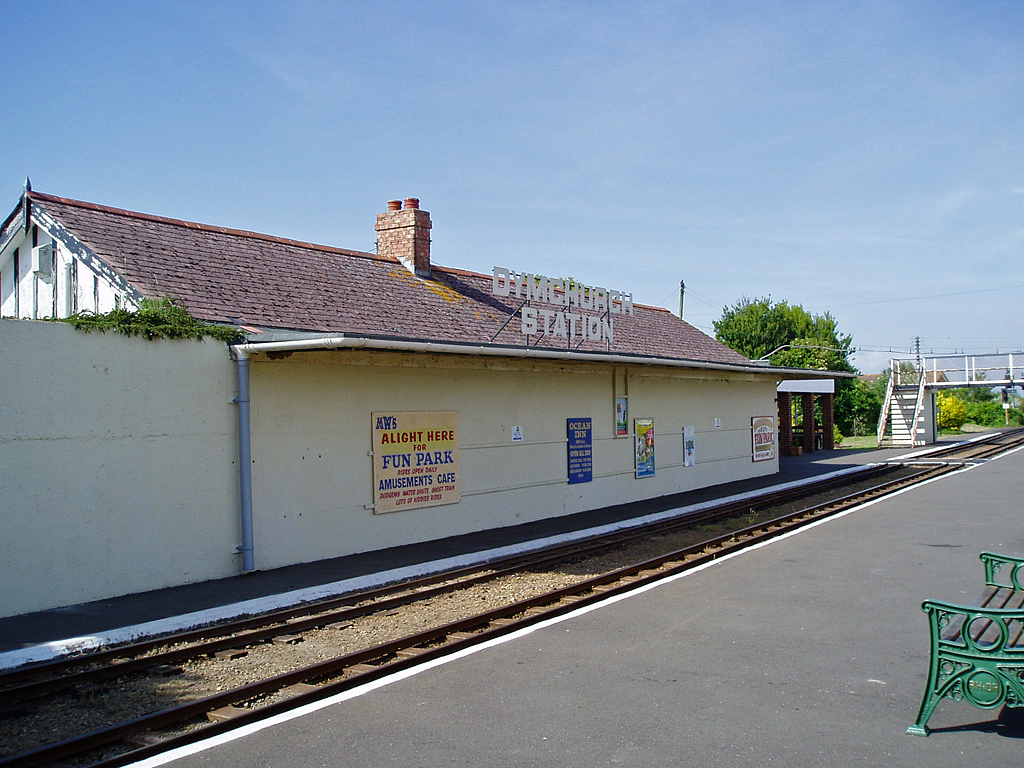
Dymchurch railway station main station building looking towards Burmarsh Road

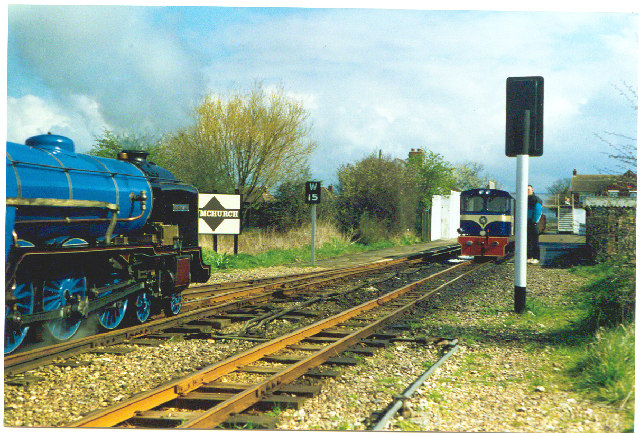
Dymchurch railway station

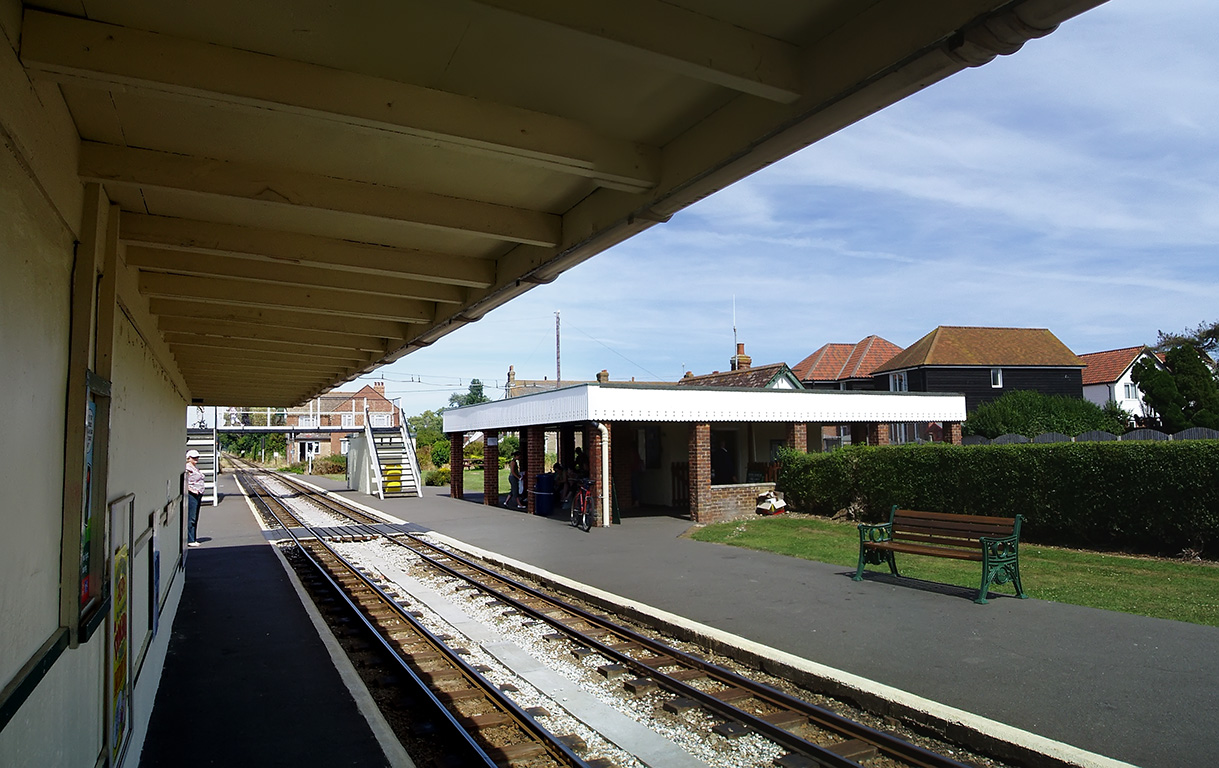
Dymchurch railway station looking towards the ticket office

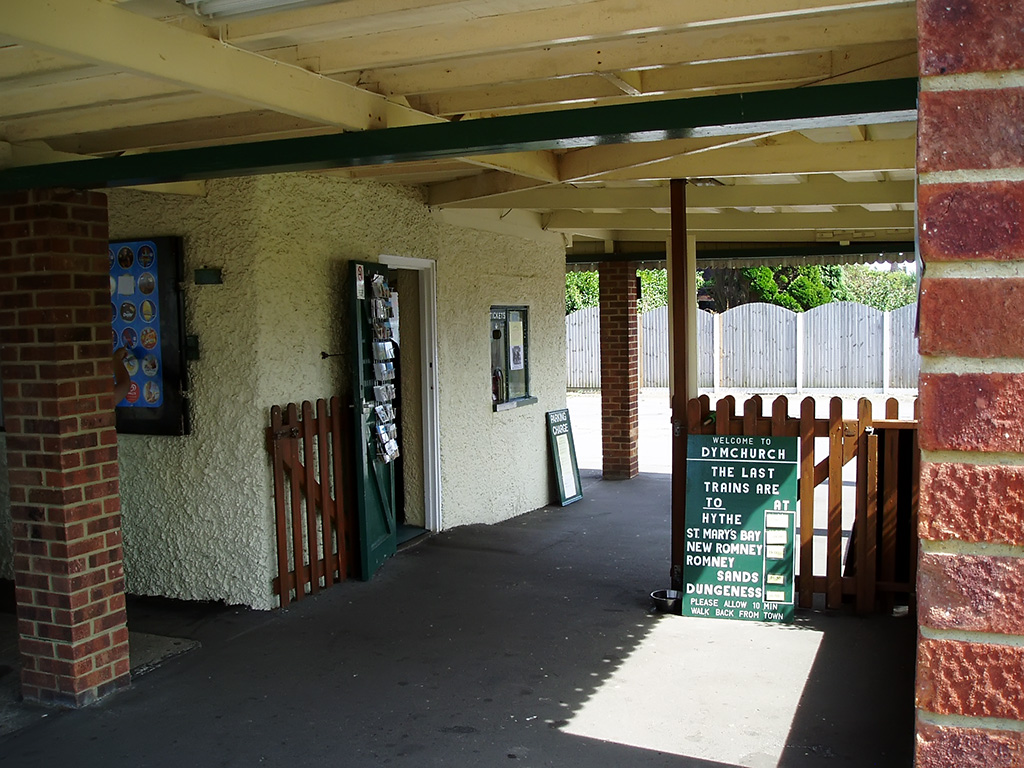
Dymchurch railway station ticket office

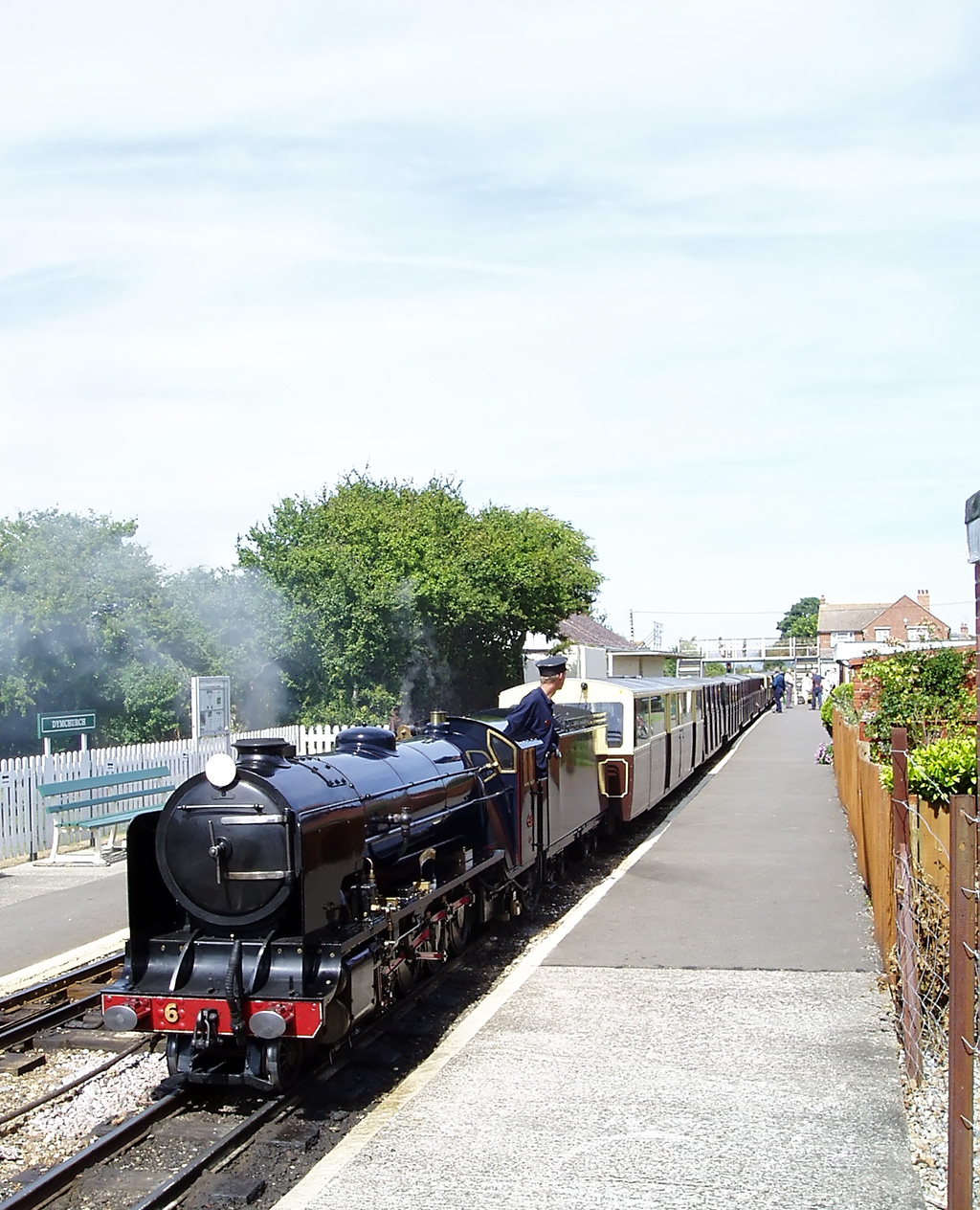
A train pulled by the locomotive Samson about to leave Dymchurch station

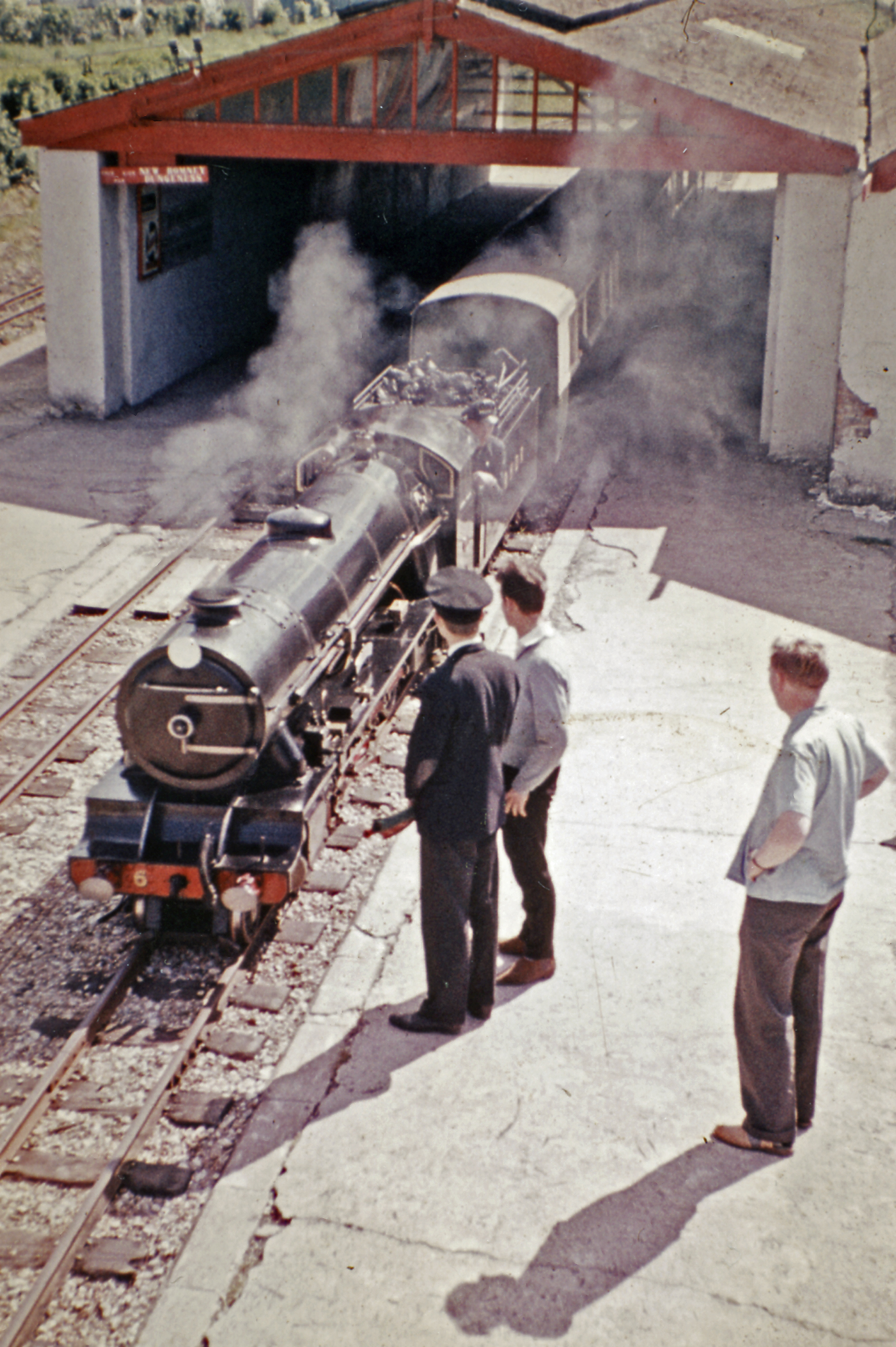
Train for Hythe in 1962

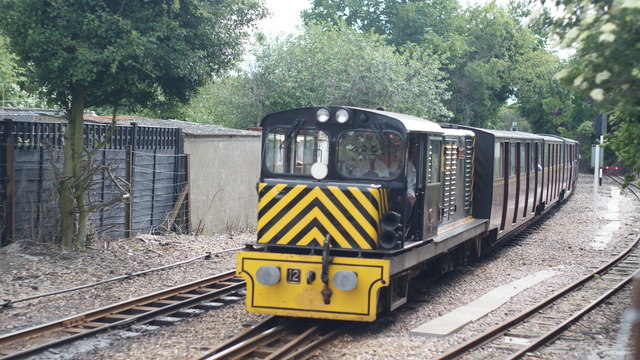
John Southland approaches Dymchurch station

Preceding station	Heritage railways	Following station
St Mary's Bay towards Dungeness	Romney, Hythe & Dymchurch Railway	Hythe Terminus
Former service
Golden Sands Halt Line open, station closed towards Dungeness	Romney, Hythe & Dymchurch Railway	Burmarsh Road Line open, station closed towards Hythe
