= Clitheroe (surname) =

Clitheroe is an English surname derived from the town of Clitheroe in Lancashire, England.

== Notable people ==
Notable people with this surname include:

- Eleanor Clitheroe (born 1954), Canadian Anglican priest
- Helen Clitheroe (born 1974), British runner
- Jimmy Clitheroe (1921–1973), English comic
- Paul Clitheroe (born 1955), Australian television presenter
- Richard Clitheroe, multiple people
- Roger Clitheroe (born 1966), English cricketer

== See also ==
- Baron Clitheroe
