= John Ellis (MP for New Romney) =

English Member of Parliament

John Ellis (died 1400 or after), of New Romney, Kent, was an English Member of Parliament (MP).

He was a member of the Parliament of England for New Romney in 1385, September 1388 and 1391.
