= Richard Stuppeny =

16th-century English politician

Richard Stuppeny (by 1487 – 1540), of New Romney, Kent, was an English politician.

He was a member of parliament (MP) for New Romney in 1515. He was also jurat, chamberlain, and commissioner of subsidy in the town and was bailiff to Yarmouth.
