= Richard Clitheroe (died c. 1463) =

English politician

Richard Clitheroe (died c. 1463), of New Romney, Kent, was an English politician.

Clitheroe was the son of William Clitheroe, also an MP for New Romney, and the nephew of Richard Clitheroe, MP for Kent.

He was a Member (MP) of the Parliament of England for New Romney in April 1414, 1415, March 1416, 1419, 1420, May 1421, 1422, 1423, 1429, 1435, 1437, 1442, 1445 and 1447. He was also jurat and (possibly deputy) bailiff of Romney and was the Cinque Ports’ bailiff at Yarmouth. He may have served as coroner of Kent.
