= St Nicholas Church, New Romney =

Church of St Nicholas, New Romney
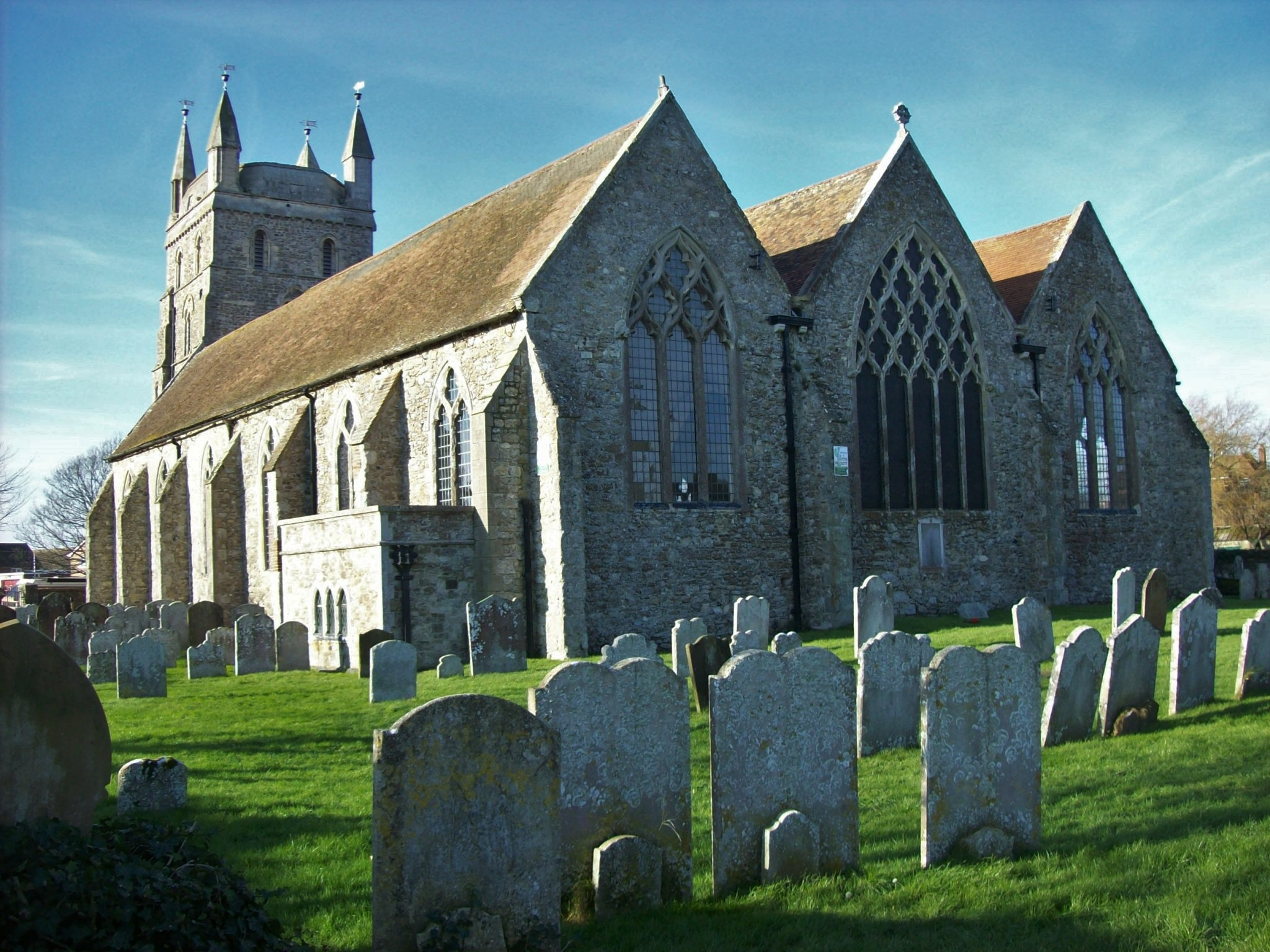
- Church of St Nicholas, New Romney
- 50°59′6″N 0°56′28″E
- OS grid reference: TR 065 248
- Location: New Romney, Kent
- Country: England
- Denomination: Church of England
- Website: Romney Churches

History
- Dedication: Saint Nicholas

Architecture
- Heritage designation: Grade I
- Designated: 28 August 1951

Administration
- Diocese: Diocese of Canterbury
- Deanery: Deanery of Romney

St Nicholas Church is an Anglican church in New Romney, Kent, England, and in the Diocese of Canterbury. It is a Grade I listed building. The earliest parts of the church date from the 12th century.

== Churches in the town ==
Until 1547, there were five parish churches in New Romney: St. Laurence, St. Martin, St. John, St. Michael and St. Nicholas, of which only the latter survives. The oldest, St Martin, was a Saxon church; it may have been built on the site of an earlier oratory dedicated to that saint. St Laurence, a later Saxon church, stood at the west end of High Street. By 1282, St Martin and St Laurence had become dependent chapels of St Nicholas. They were both demolished in the 16th century.

== Description ==
St. Nicholas's Church traces its history back to Bishop Odo, brother-in-law of William the Conqueror, who founded the site in 1086.

The nave and clerestory, originally with low-pitched side aisles, date from the 12th century, constructed from Caen stone by masons from Normandy. The two upper stages of the tower, with corner turrets and octagonal parapet, date from about 1200.

In the 14th century, the easternmost bay of the nave, the chancel, and two side-chapels were built, and the side aisles were raised.

The church was near a harbour until the storm of 1287. The storm deposited silt in the town and changed the course of the River Rother (so that since then it has flowed into the sea at Rye); the street level remains higher than the church, and there are steps descending to the west entrance. Other traces of the storm are visible around the church.

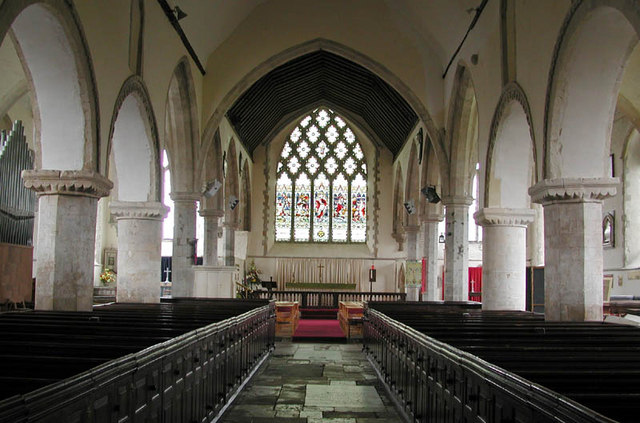
Looking east, showing the Norman arcades and the east window

The Norman arch of the west entrance, and the Norman arcades between the nave and the aisles, are notable. The east window has reticulated tracery, with Victorian stained glass commemorating members of the Stringer family, a prominent local family. In the south aisle is the tomb of Richard Stuppeny (died 1526), jurat of the town. A monumental brass on the tomb tells that it was renewed in 1622 by his great-grandson Clement Stuppeny. Until the passing of the Municipal Corporations Act 1835, the jurats assembled annually around the tomb to elect the mayor.

The Church today

As part of the Romney Marsh Benefice, the church is currently overseen by the Team Rector, the Reverend Chris Hodgkins. On the first, second and third Sundays of the month, Holy Communion is held at 11 a.m., and on fourth Sundays, morning worship is held, both according to Common Worship. Fifth Sundays, when occurring, feature Benefice Communion services which move around the Benefice.
