= Robert Geffe =

English Member of Parliament

Robert Geffe or Jeffe (fl. 1393–1406), of New Romney, Kent, was an English Member of Parliament (MP).

He was a Member of the Parliament of England for New Romney in 1393, January 1397 and 1406.
