= Peter Newene =

English politician

Peter Newene (died 1437) was an English politician. He sat as MP for New Romney in December 1421.

He was the son of John Newene. He married a woman called Christine.

He also served as jurat for New Romney from 25 March 1411 till 1414, 1416 till 1417, and 1419 till 1422. He died in 1437.
