= John Adam (MP) =

Member of the Parliament of England

- Died: August 6, 1440
- Occupation: politician

John Adam (died 6 August 1440) was an English politician who was MP for New Romney in 1410, February 1413, March 1416, 1419, 1423, 1427, 1429, and 1431, and jurat and bailiff for the aforementioned town on many occasions. He was the Cinque Ports’ bailiff at Yarmouth from September to November 1410 and in 1430. History of Parliament Online theorizes that he was a son of Stephen Adam.
