= Robert Paris (footballer) =

English footballer (born 1978)

Rob Paris
Personal information
- Full name: Robert Paris
- Date of birth: 19 June 1978 (age 48)
- Place of birth: Bracknell, Berkshire, England
- Position: Defender

Senior career*
Years	Team	Apps	(Gls)
1996–1997	Slough Town		
1999–2000	Beaconsfield SYCOB		
2000–2001	Northwood	18	(0)
2002	Aylesbury United		
2002–2003	Maidenhead United		
2003–2004	Hampton & Richmond Borough		
2004–2005	Kingstonian	18	(2)
2005–2008	Hampton & Richmond Borough	89	(16)
2007	→ Walton Casuals (loan)	2	(0)
2008–2011	Burnham	7	(2)
2011	Eton Wick		

International career^{‡}
2008	Anguilla	2	(0)
- * Club domestic league appearances and goals as of 25 May 2016 ‡ National team caps and goals as of 25 May 2016

Robert Paris (born 19 June 1978) is a former footballer who played for a host of non-league clubs and the Anguilla national team.

== Club career ==
Paris began his career with Slough Town, under the management of Brian McDermott. The defender joined the club ahead of the 1996–97 season. After a spell with Beaconsfield SYCOB, he then joined Northwood, and managed 18 appearances.

After impressing manager Cliff Hercules, Paris joined Aylesbury United midway through the 2001–02 campaign. Scoring four goals in 28 games, he was released when new manager Steve Cordery took over. Upon his departure, Paris moved to Hampton & Richmond Borough ahead of the 2003–04 season.

Joining Kingstonian in January 2005, he scored two goals in 18 games. Making his debut on New Years Day 2005 in a 2–0 defeat to Yeading, he found the net against Tonbridge Angels and AFC Wimbledon in the coming weeks. Paris remained with the K's until the end of the 2004–05 season.

The defender then returned Hampton & Richmond Borough in July 2005, where he remained for three years. Paris joined Isthmian Division One South side Walton Casuals on loan in October 2007, but only managed two games for the club before his return.

In March 2008, he signed for Wealdstone on a dual registration with Hampton & Richmond Borough. After suffering a knee injury, Hampton & Richmond supporters raised over £1,000 to fund the operation shortly before his departure.

Paris joined Burnham in July 2008, where he stayed for three seasons. He later moved to East Berks Premier Division side Eton Wick, where he was ever present throughout the season. However, after being left on the bench for the 2012 Maidenhead Norfolkian's Senior Cup Final and East Berks League Cup, he walked out the ground in protest and refused to play for the club again.

== International career ==
Paris made his international debut for Anguilla on 6 February 2008, playing in a 12–0 defeat to El Salvador during the 2010 World Cup qualifiers. He also played in the return match, which ended in a 4–0 defeat three days later.
