= Jack Bunting =

English footballer

Personal information
- Full name: John Baden Bunting
- Date of birth: 1900
- Place of birth: Bingham, Nottinghamshire, England
- Date of death: 9 January 1951 (aged 50)
- Place of death: Bingham, England
- Height: 6 ft 2 in (1.88 m)
- Position: Goalkeeper

Senior career*
Years	Team	Apps	(Gls)
19??–1921	Grantham		
1921	Nottingham Forest	0	(0)
1921–1921	Grantham		
1922	Leicester City	0	(0)
1922–1924	Boston Town		
1924–1925	Brighton & Hove Albion	8	(0)
1925–19??	Mansfield Town		
- * Club domestic league appearances and goals

John Baden Bunting (1900 – 9 January 1951) was an English professional footballer who played as a goalkeeper in the Football League for Brighton & Hove Albion.

== Life and career ==
Bunting was born in 1900 in Bingham, Nottinghamshire, the son of George Bunting, a railway platelayer, and his wife Sarah. He served as a sergeant in the King's Own Yorkshire Light Infantry, and played football for Grantham as an amateur. He had a trial with Nottingham Forest towards the end of the 1920–21 season, before signing professional forms with Grantham in July.

Bunting signed for Leicester City in March 1922. According to the Nottingham Evening Post, "Bunting is undoubtedly one of the ablest custodians in the Central Alliance, and the only surprise is that he has not been transferred months ago." He performed well for Leicester's reserve team, and was selected for the Second Division side to face Rotherham County on 22 April, but was unable to play when it emerged that Nottingham Forest still held his League registration from the previous season's trial. He then spent two seasons with Boston Town of the Midland League, before joining Brighton & Hove Albion of the Third Division South as backup for Walter Cook. He finally made his Football League debut on 20 September 1924 at home to Gillingham, and performed well as Albion climbed to second place in the table, but lost his place after two defeats and failed to regain it.

At the end of the season Bunting signed for Mansfield Town on a free transfer, but was soon forced to retire from football because of the effects of an injury suffered while a Brighton player. He spent time in the Nottingham City Police, and worked on the railways during the Second World War. He remained unmarried, and had lived with his sister at Bingham until his death from tuberculosis at the age of 50.
