= Hythe railway station (Romney, Hythe and Dymchurch Railway) =

Railway station in Kent, England

Hythe
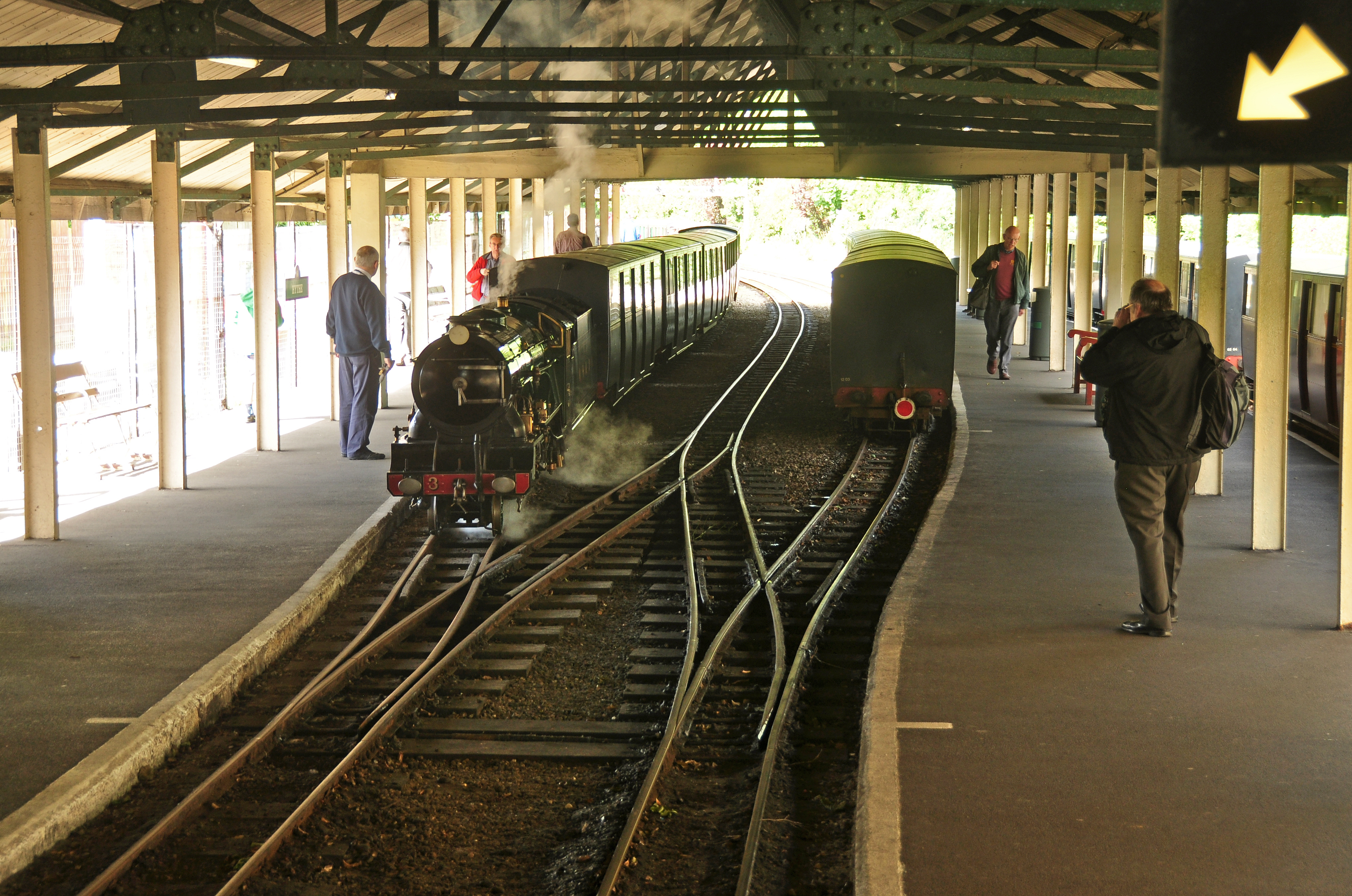
- Hythe Station

General information
- Location: Hythe, Folkestone & Hythe; England
- Coordinates: 51°4′16.8″N 1°4′21″E
- Grid reference: TR153347
- System: Station on heritage railway
- Manager: RHDR
- Platforms: 3 open (originally 4)

Key dates
- 16 July 1927: Opened
- 1940: closed
- 1946: reopened
Location

Hythe station is the northern terminus of the Romney, Hythe and Dymchurch Railway. The station has curved platforms with an overall roof, loco release road, former engine shed (now an independent engineering works), signalbox with 16 lever frame, and a turntable. In terms of passenger bookings Hythe is the busiest station on the railway.

Adjacent to the station the former station master's house is now a private residence. Situated between the station and the Royal Military Canal is The Light Railway Restaurant which was originally built by the railway company but sold before it was even completed. It was finally repurchased by the railway in February 2015.

The station is situated to the south of the town on the A259 road to Folkestone, and follows the same alignment as the Royal Military Canal.

The ancient Cinque Port offers shopping facilities with restaurants, cafes, pubs, banks, supermarkets, antique shops, general shops, swimming baths, gardens, parks and a seafront.

== Platforms ==
Of the three platforms, only numbers 2 and 3 are normally used for arrivals and departures, number 1 being used mainly for stock storage as it has no loco release facility. Prior to the 1970s resignalling it was used for occasional departures, although today this happens very rarely and it is used largely for non-passenger trains.

As originally built the station had a fourth platform to the south with its own loco release road, and platform three had no release facility. It seems the original design (as with the Dymchurch bay platform) assumed trains would arrive and then shunt into a different departure platform to release the loco and turn. In the 1920s the layout was altered to make operation more efficient. Platform 4 disappeared in the resignalling, as platforms were extended and has now been incorporated into the car park.

Preceding station	Heritage railways	Following station
Dymchurch towards Dungeness	Romney, Hythe & Dymchurch Railway	Terminus
Former service
Prince of Wales Halt Line open, station closed towards Dungeness	Romney, Hythe & Dymchurch Railway	Terminus

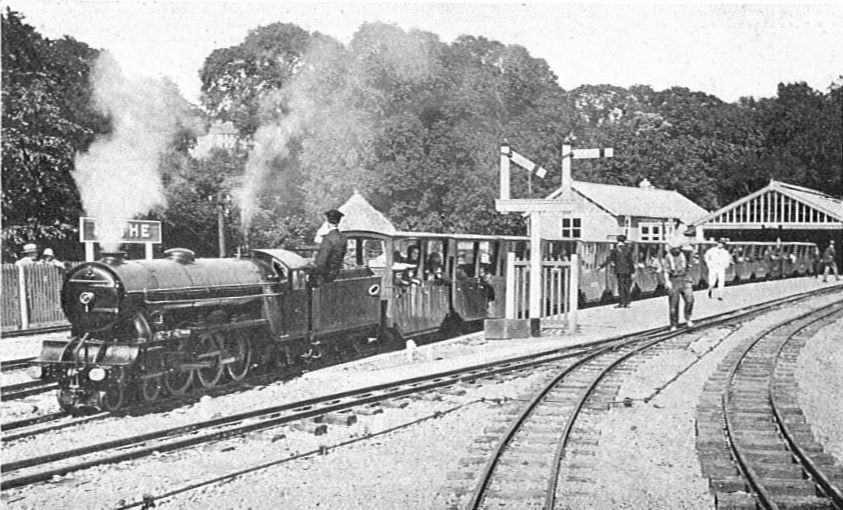
Leaving Hythe station, RH&DR, 1928

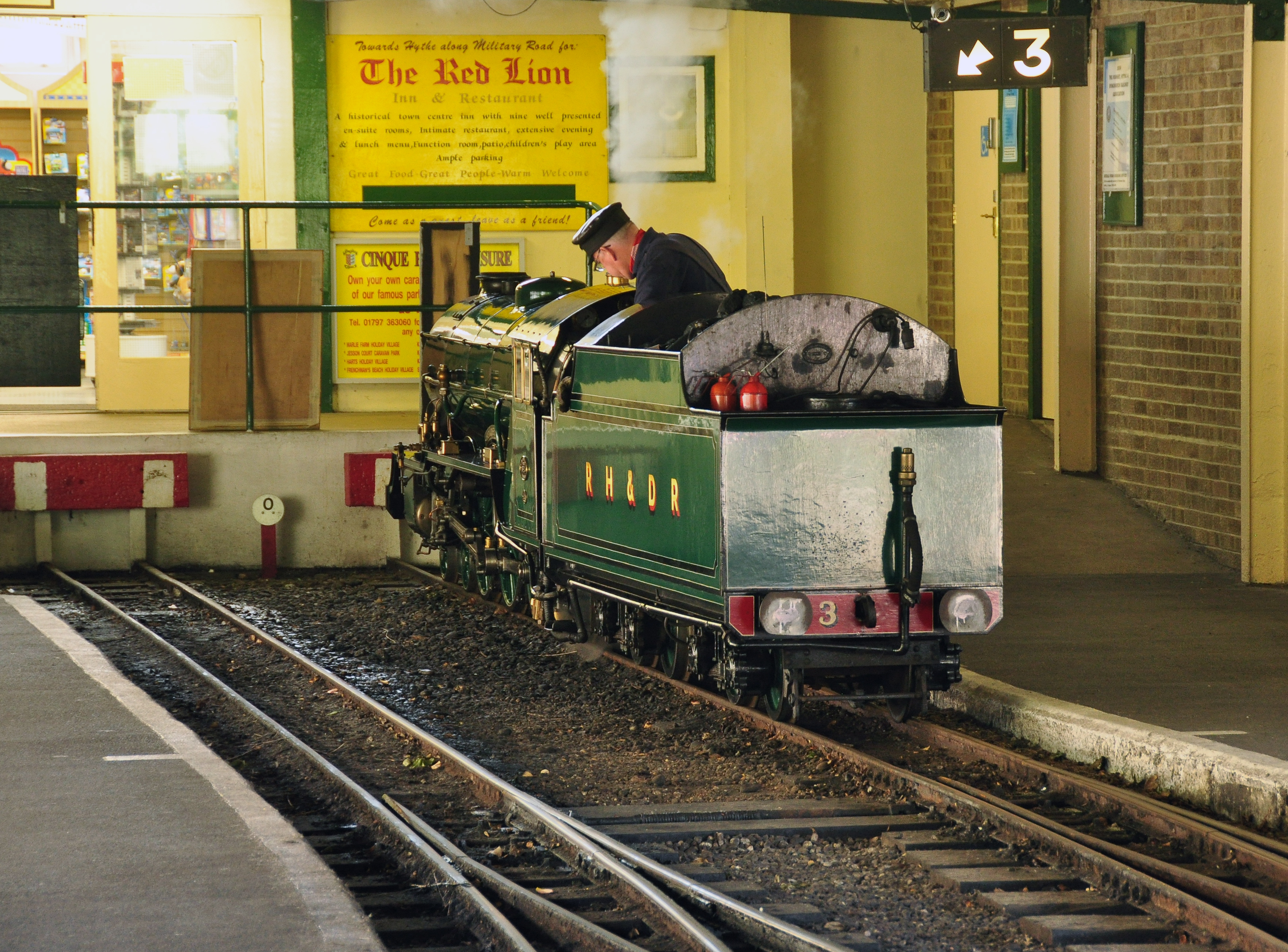
No. 3 Southern Maid at Hythe station

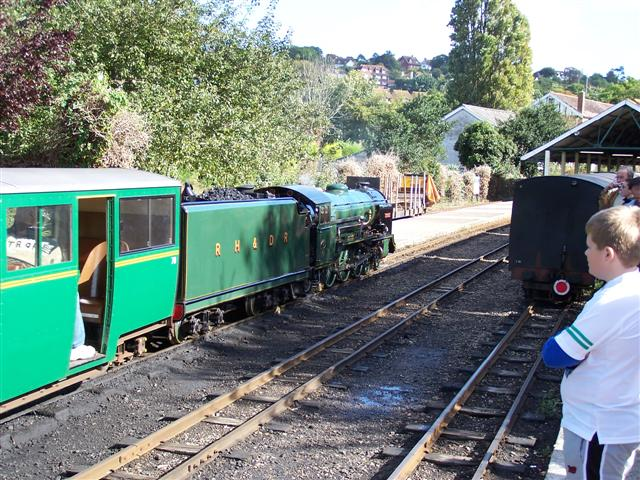
No. 7 Typhoon arriving at Hythe

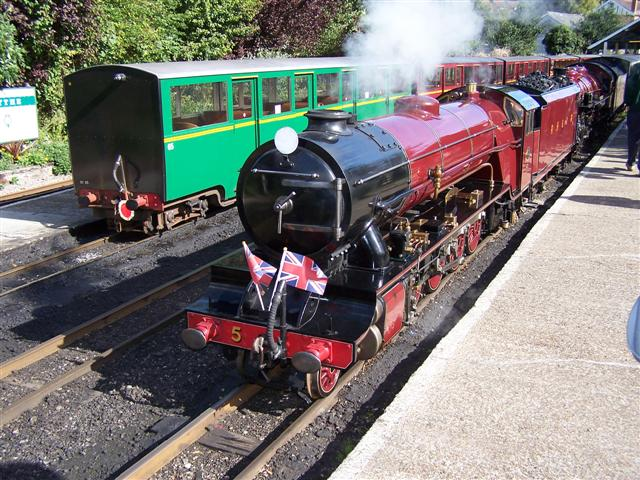
No. 5 Hercules leaving Hythe

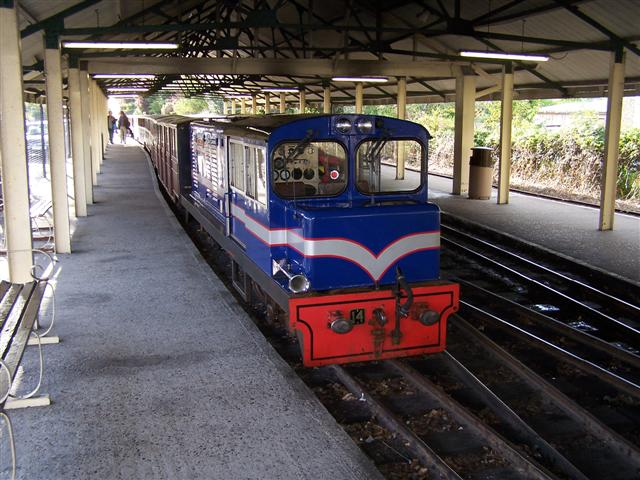
No. 14 Capt. Howey under the roof

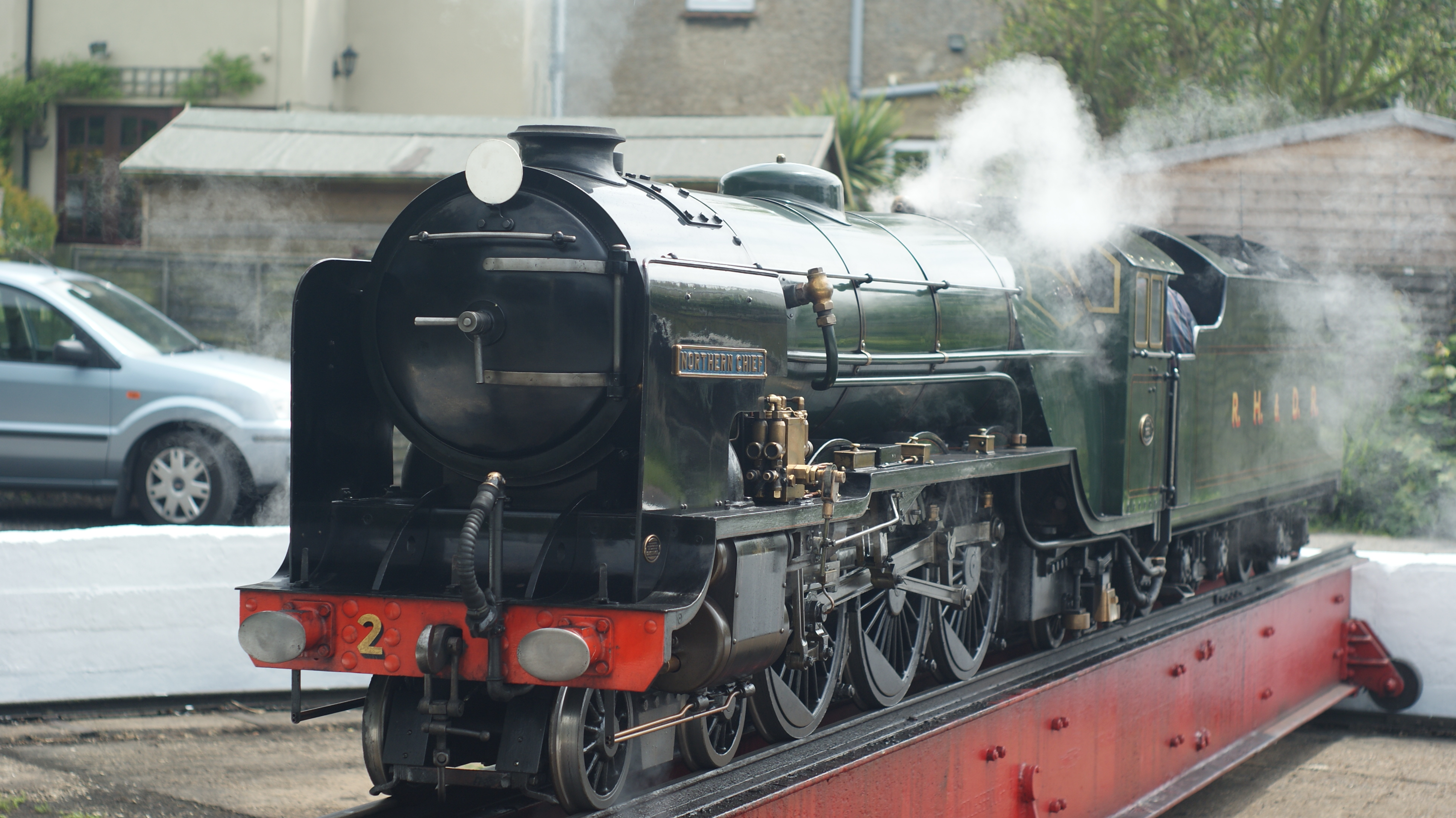
No. 2 Northern Chief on the Hythe turntable

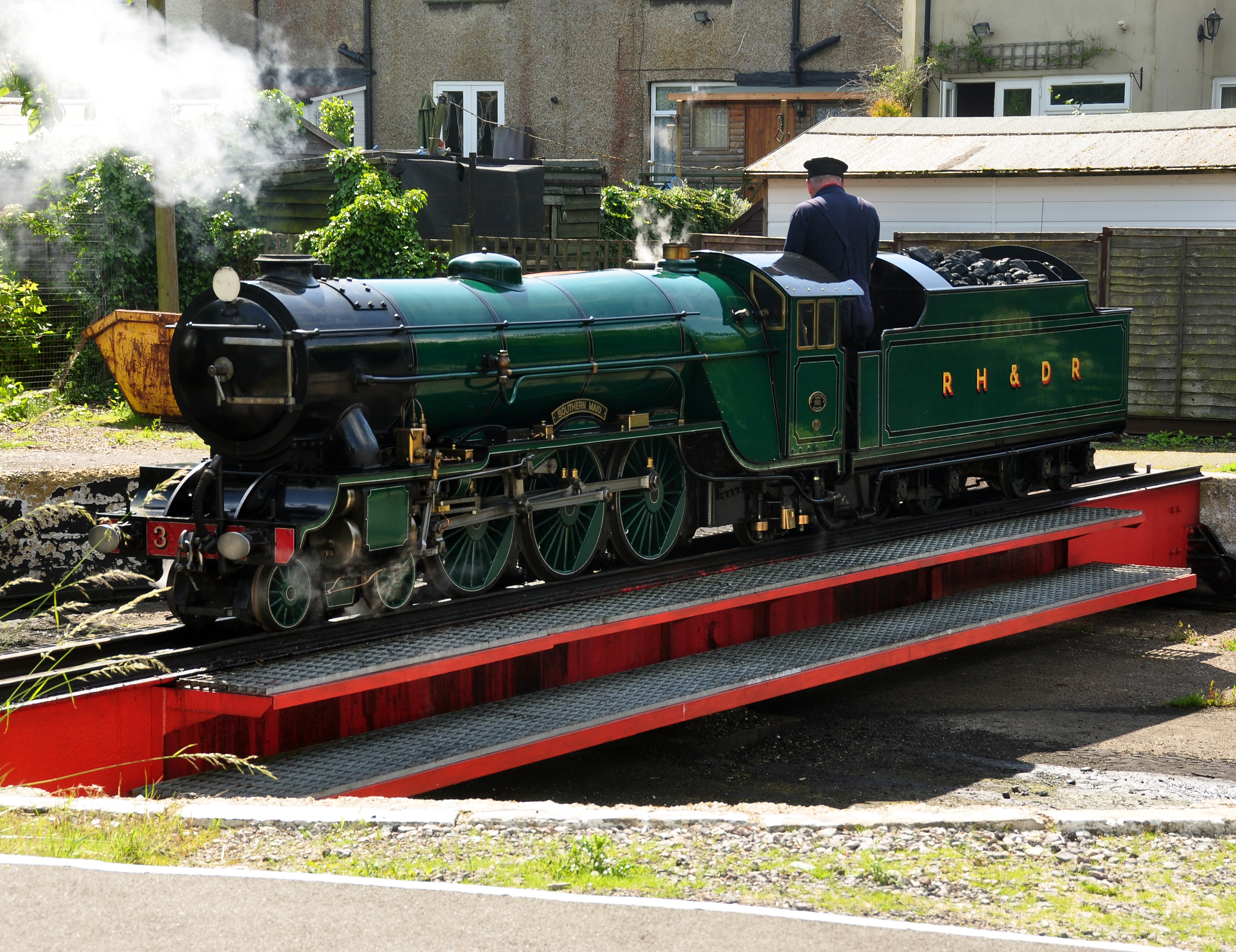
No. 3 Southern Maid on the turntable

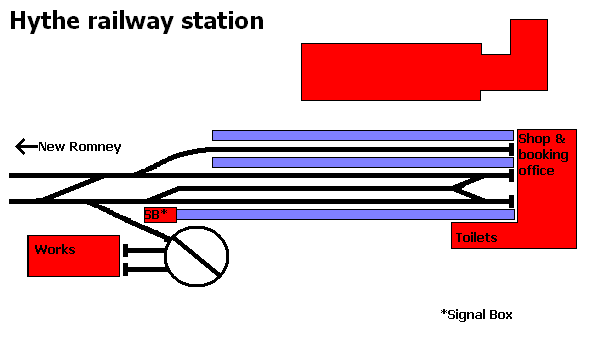
Track layout
