= New Romney =

Town in Kent, England

Coordinates: 50.985°N 0.941°E

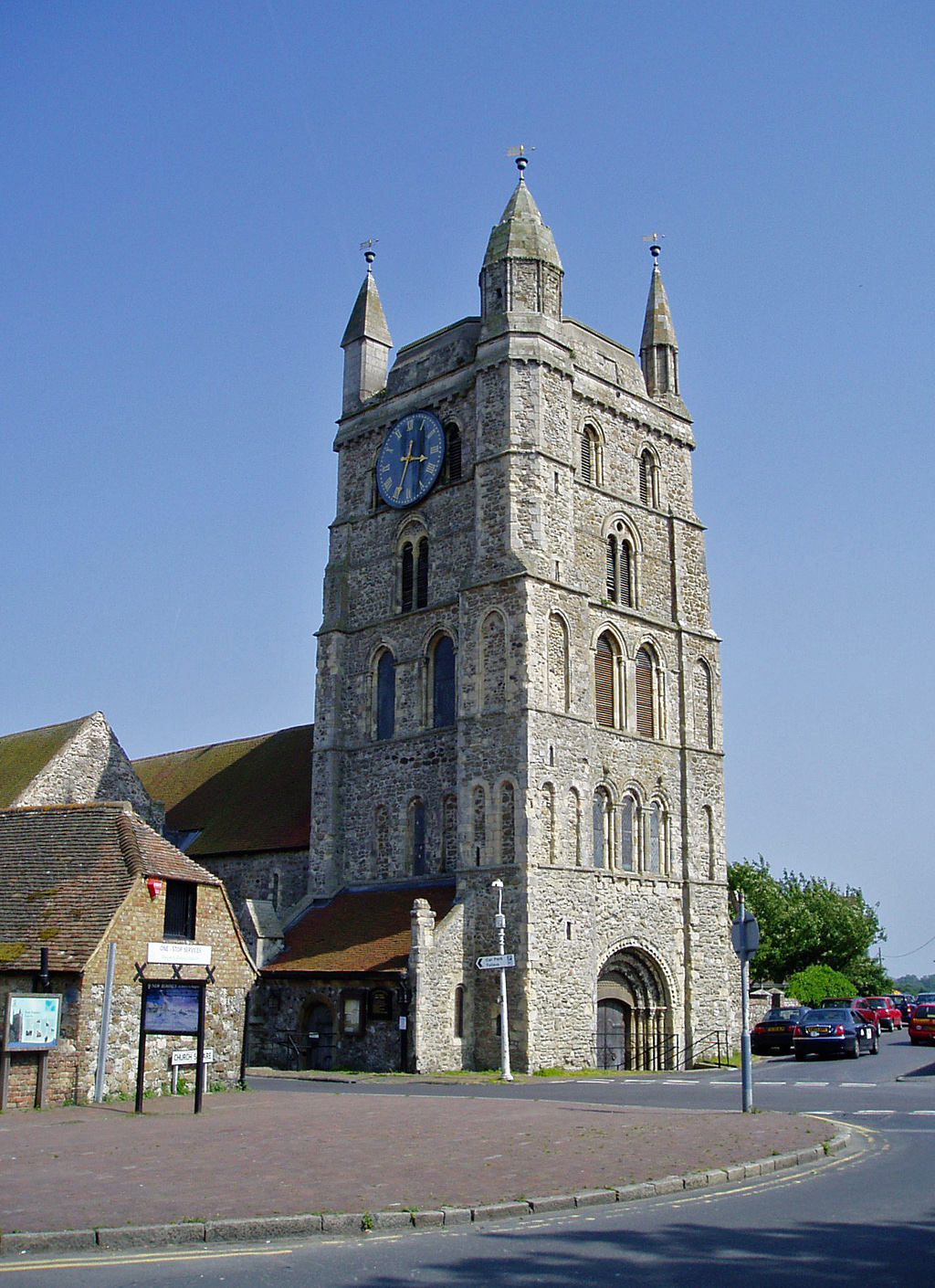
- The New Romney Church tower in 2007

- Arms of New Romney

- Location within Kent
- Population: 6,996 (2011)
- OS grid reference: TR066249
- Civil parish: New Romney
- District: Folkestone and Hythe
- Shire county: Kent
- Region: South East
- Country: England
- Sovereign state: United Kingdom
- Post town: NEW ROMNEY
- Postcode district: TN28
- Dialling code: 01797
- Police: Kent
- Fire: Kent
- Ambulance: South East Coast
- UK Parliament: Folkestone and Hythe

New Romney is a market town in Kent, England, on the edge of Romney Marsh, an area of flat, rich agricultural land reclaimed from the sea after the harbour began to silt up. New Romney, one of the original Cinque Ports, was once a sea port, with the harbour adjacent to the church, but is now more than a mile from the sea. It is the headquarters of the Romney, Hythe and Dymchurch Railway.

== Geography ==
New Romney is not significantly different in age from the nearby village of Old Romney. However New Romney, now about a mile and a half from the seafront, was originally a harbour town at the mouth of the River Rother. The Rother estuary was always difficult to navigate, with many shallow channels and sandbanks. One possible explanation for the names of two local settlements, Greatstone and Littlestone, is the effects of longshore drift, which disperses shingle and sand deposits, from west to east, with heavier stones accumulating in the area known as Greatstone, while far smaller shingle is to be found in great quantities at Littlestone. Very fine sand is found further east at neighbouring St Mary's Bay.

== History ==
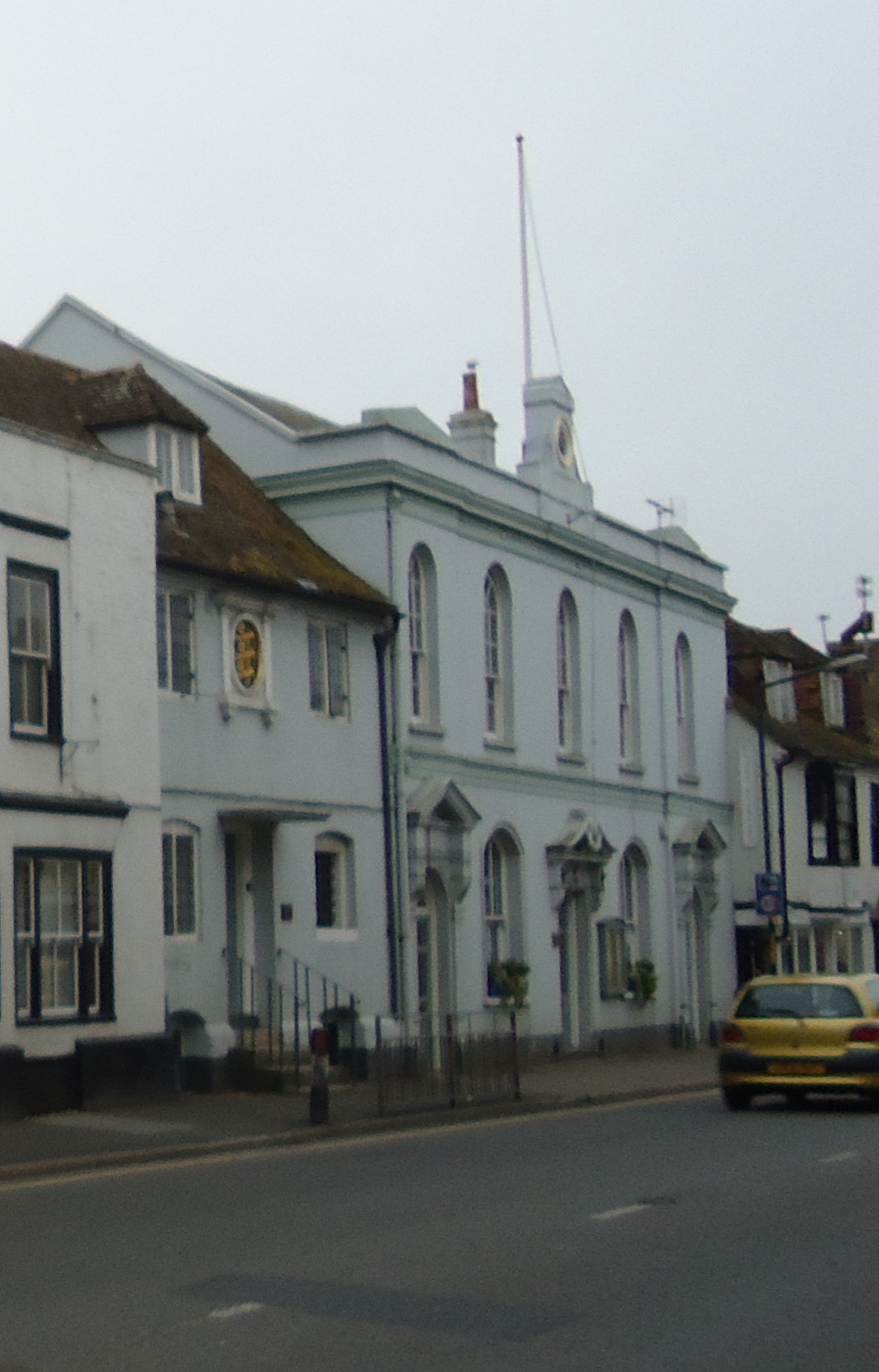
New Romney Town Hall

The name Romney is of uncertain origin. The latter part of the name derives from the Old English ēa meaning 'river'. The first part of the name has a few possible derivations. It may derive from Rumen meaning 'the broad one' or perhaps a personal name. Another possibility is that it derives from Romanus, the name of a priest who held land in the area in the 7th century.

In the latter part of the thirteenth century a series of severe storms weakened the coastal defences of Romney Marsh, and the South England flood of February 1287 almost destroyed the town, as it did destroy the nearby ancient parish of Broomhill. The harbour and town were filled with sand, silt, mud and debris, and the River Rother changed course to run out into the sea near Rye, Sussex. The mud, silt and sand were never entirely removed from the town, which is why many old buildings, especially the church, have steps leading down into them from the present pavement level.

New Romney is one of the original Cinque Ports of England, although its importance declined rapidly during the fourteenth and fifteenth centuries after the loss of the harbour. Archaeological investigations in 2007 during replacement of the town's main drainage have cast new light on the medieval origins and development of the town. New Romney Town Hall was built in 1702.

During World War II a fleet of floating concrete harbour sections (called Mulberry Harbours) were towed across the English Channel to France to aid the Allied landings. One of these harbour pieces remains, embedded in a sandbank just off the coast by Littlestone-on-Sea, and is clearly visible at low tide. Further up the coast during the Pipe Line Under The Ocean, or PLUTO, oil was pumped to France under the English Channel for use by allied troops.

New Romney is the main centre of population on the Romney Marsh. Founded in 1610 by John Southland and formerly known locally as just "Southland's", John Southland's Community Comprehensive School, the only secondary school in the area, was renamed The Marsh Academy in August 2007.

== Town centre ==
Like many towns on the marsh it has an impressive Norman church, the Church of St Nicholas, in the centre of town. This church originally stood at the harbourside, and its entrances are several feet below ground level. The church is also notable for the boat hooks still evident on the side walls.

New Romney's historic high street has several small and interesting shops. A few businesses closed after the opening of a branch of supermarket chain Sainsbury's, but the town retains much of its character. The former almshouses in West Street are noted historic buildings of Kent; they were founded in 1610 by John Southland, an important local magnate, and rebuilt in 1734. Adjacent to these is Plantagenet House and No 3 Old Stone Cottage, which originated as a single house constructed c. 1300–1350. Researchers think it was originally the home of the Master of The Hospital of St John the Baptist, a large secular establishment. The hospital was operating by c. 1260 and flourished until the close of the fifteenth century.

Three-quarters of a mile north of the town is the links golf course at Littlestone-on-Sea. The golf course was a favourite of Denis Thatcher, late husband of former British prime minister Margaret Thatcher, and has been used several times for the qualifying rounds of The Open Championship.

== Transport ==
The Romney, Hythe and Dymchurch Railway has a station at the extreme east of New Romney, which as well as being a major tourist attraction was also used by students travelling to school until 2015. The station is about three-quarters of a mile east of the historic town centre.

New Romney was once serviced by the New Romney and Littlestone-on-Sea railway station which was part of the Lydd Line. The station was sited halfway between New Romney and Littlestone-on-Sea. As built the station had two platforms and a small goods yard with four sidings, a goods shed, cattle dock, coal wharves, end loading dock, water tower and other small buildings. The up platform was rarely used in latter years other than as a livestock loading dock. The station was originally called New Romney & Littlestone with on-Sea being added in October 1888. In 1927 a single line extension was built with an unprotected level crossing to an exchange siding with the adjacent Romney Hythe and Dymchurch Railway station on the opposite side of the Station Road; it was used to deliver coal to that railway. The signal box was taken out of use in the 1950s and goods service was withdrawn in 1964. The station was closed in 1967 and replaced with a bus service.

New Romney is easily accessible by road, sitting astride the A259 (which runs from Folkestone to Havant). Several bus services run to and through New Romney from Hastings, Folkestone and Ashford. The former B2070 road from the town to Hamstreet and Ashford is now declassified while the B2071 still exists to Littlestone.

== Media ==
New Romney has one dedicated weekly newspaper, the Kentish Express (published by the KM Group) is the only weekly newspaper for the Romney Marsh covering the town. There is also the Folkestone Herald (which incorporated the Romney Marsh Herald in 2014, published by Kent Regional News and Media). The local radio station for New Romney is KMFM Ashford which contains Marsh-based adverts amongst a county-wide station, and New Romney is also served by the county-wide stations Heart South, Gold and BBC Radio Kent.

Cinque Ports Radio 100.2FM is the community radio station for Romney Marsh and has been broadcasting since 7 March 2022 replacing Shoreline FM which now broadcasts online to the same area as Shoreline Easy and previously broadcast on 100.2FM since January 2020

In 1951 the Richard Burton, Roger Livesey, and Honor Blackman film Green Grow the Rushes was made on location in and around New Romney and in nearby St Mary in the Marsh.

== Namesakes ==
In 1762 Thomas Fairfax, 6th Lord Fairfax of Cameron named the town of Romney in present-day West Virginia in the United States after the town of New Romney.

== Arms ==
Coat of arms of New Romney
| Notes Recorded at the Visitation of 1619, for the Borough of New Romney Escutcheon Azure three Lions passant guardant in pale Or |

== See also ==
- Henry Sydney, 1st Earl of Romney
