= Prince of Wales Halt railway station =

Former railway station in England

Coordinates: 51.06496°N 1.05528°E

Prince of Wales Halt

General information
- Location: Palmarsh, Folkestone & Hythe; England
- Platforms: 2 (unsurfaced)

Other information
- Status: Disused

History
- Original company: RHDR

Key dates
- 16 July 1927: Opened
- 1928: Station closed to passengers
Location

Prince of Wales Halt railway station was a short-lived station on the Romney, Hythe and Dymchurch Railway in Kent, England.

About three quarters of a mile from the Hythe terminus, in an area known as Palmarsh, the railway line and the Royal Military Canal (previously running side by side) finally diverge, and the railway line passes under a large, double-arched, bridge carrying the road from Hythe to Lympne. Originally it was intended to cross the road here on the level, but strenuous opposition from Hythe Borough Council led the Light Railway Commissioners to insist on a bridge, which it is said added £250 to the railway's construction cost.

This bridge, and the halt located here, took their names from the nearby Prince of Wales public house. The halt never had any station buildings, and was simply a request stop for service trains, accessed by means of a steep footpath down from the road to the trackside, beside the bridge.

The halt opened with the opening of the line in 1927, appearing in the timetables for the first year of operation only, before closing in 1928 due to lack of traffic. Contemporary traffic figures, although sparse, could imply that no passenger ever used this tiny station. Its only historical distinctions are that it was, by a wide margin, the most short-lived, the most sparsely equipped, and the most under-used station on the line.

Preceding station	Heritage railways	Following station
Former service
Botolph's Bridge Halt Line open, station closed towards Dungeness	Romney, Hythe & Dymchurch Railway	Hythe Line and station open Terminus
