= Dymchurch Redoubt =

Fortification in Kent, England

Coordinates: 51°2′56″N 1°2′11″E

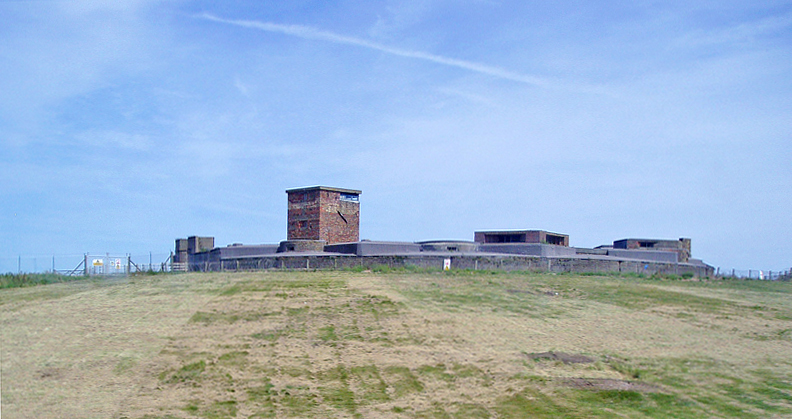
The Dymchurch Redoubt

Dymchurch Grand Redoubt is a fortification at Palmarsh on the coast of Kent in England, built during the Napoleonic War as part of a large defensive scheme to protect the country from an expected French invasion.

== Description ==
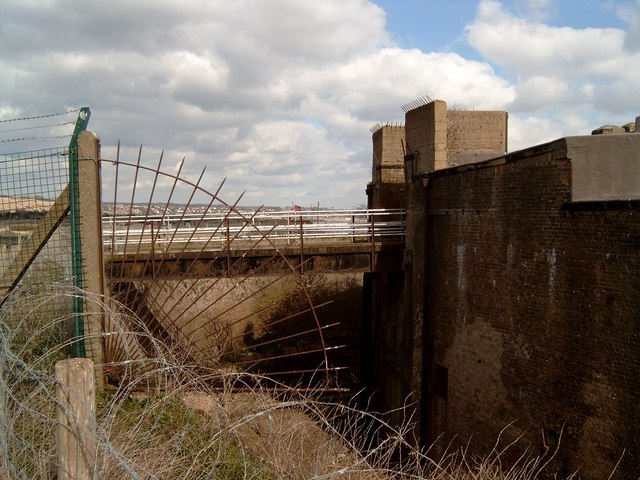
The entrance bridge and ditch at Dymchurch Redoubt.

Dymchurch Redoubt is circular in form and built of brick with granite and sandstone dressings. It measures up to 68 metres in diameter and stands 12 metres above the floor of its 9-metre-wide ditch or dry moat. It lacks the caponiers or musketry galleries of the otherwise similar Eastbourne Redoubt. Beyond the moat, an earth bank or glacis helped to protect the masonry from artillery fire. Built on two stories, the upper floor had open emplacements for ten 24 pounder guns mounted on wooden traversing platforms. The lower floor featured twenty-four vaulted barrack and storage casemates that opened onto a circular parade ground. They were designed to accommodate 350 officers and men. Entry was originally via a wooden footbridge supported by stilts, which could be collapsed in an emergency.

== History ==
The design and purpose of the redoubt were finalised at a conference in Rochester in 1804. It was built between 1804 and 1812 to support a chain of 21 Martello Towers that stretched between Hythe in Kent and Rye in Sussex, and to act as a supply depot for them. It specifically protected the sluices that were the key to the drainage of Romney Marsh. By the time it was finished, the invasion threat was over. During World War I, it was used for troop accommodation, although there was a question in Parliament about the damp conditions. In World War II, the south coast was again at risk of invasion, and two 6 inch breech-loading guns were mounted in casemates built over the original gun emplacements. A prominent battery observation post was built and pillboxes were sited on the parapet in order to repel an infantry attack. It was fully operational by 1942 as an Emergency Coastal Battery. After the war, the observation post was used as a Coastguard lookout and radar was installed to monitor shipping in the English Channel. The army constructed a mock-up of a street of buildings in the interior, for training in urban warfare. The redoubt remains the property of the Ministry of Defence. It is a Scheduled Monument and is listed by English Heritage as a Building at Risk, although a conservation plan has been agreed.

== Location ==
The Dymchurch Redoubt is located on the south (seaward) side of the A259 main road roughly halfway between the village of Dymchurch and the town of Hythe. It is located on the edge of the Palmarsh community, and about two miles from Dymchurch, whose name it bears. It is not open to the public, but walking along the sea wall allows a close approach on the south side. Further access may be restricted when there is firing on Hythe Ranges. When the ranges are in use, prominent red flags are flown, supplemented by red lights during night firing practice. Due to the risk of ricochet during firing, a Range Safety Boat is present to prevent boats entering the danger area.

== See also ==
- Shorncliffe Redoubt
- Lympne Castle
- Sandgate Castle
- Harwich Redoubt
- Littlehampton Redoubt
- British anti-invasion preparations of 1803–05
