= The Roughs =

Coordinates: 51°4′4″N 1°3′2″E

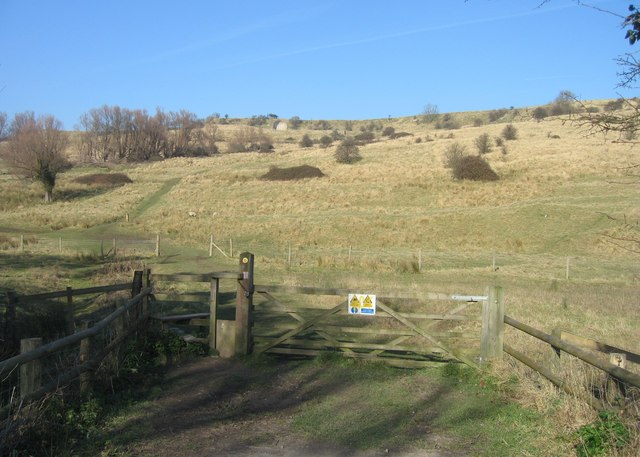
The Roughs

The Roughs are an escarpment of the North Downs above Romney Marsh in Kent, on the south coast of England. The term is generally applied to the section between Hythe and West Hythe but the structure extends as far west as Bilsington, and the highest point is 106 m just west of Port Lympne Mansion

A concrete sound disk (or Sound mirror) has been built in the hillside. This was used to listen out for approaching aircraft during World War II.
