= Royal Military Canal Path =

27-mile footpath in south-eastern England

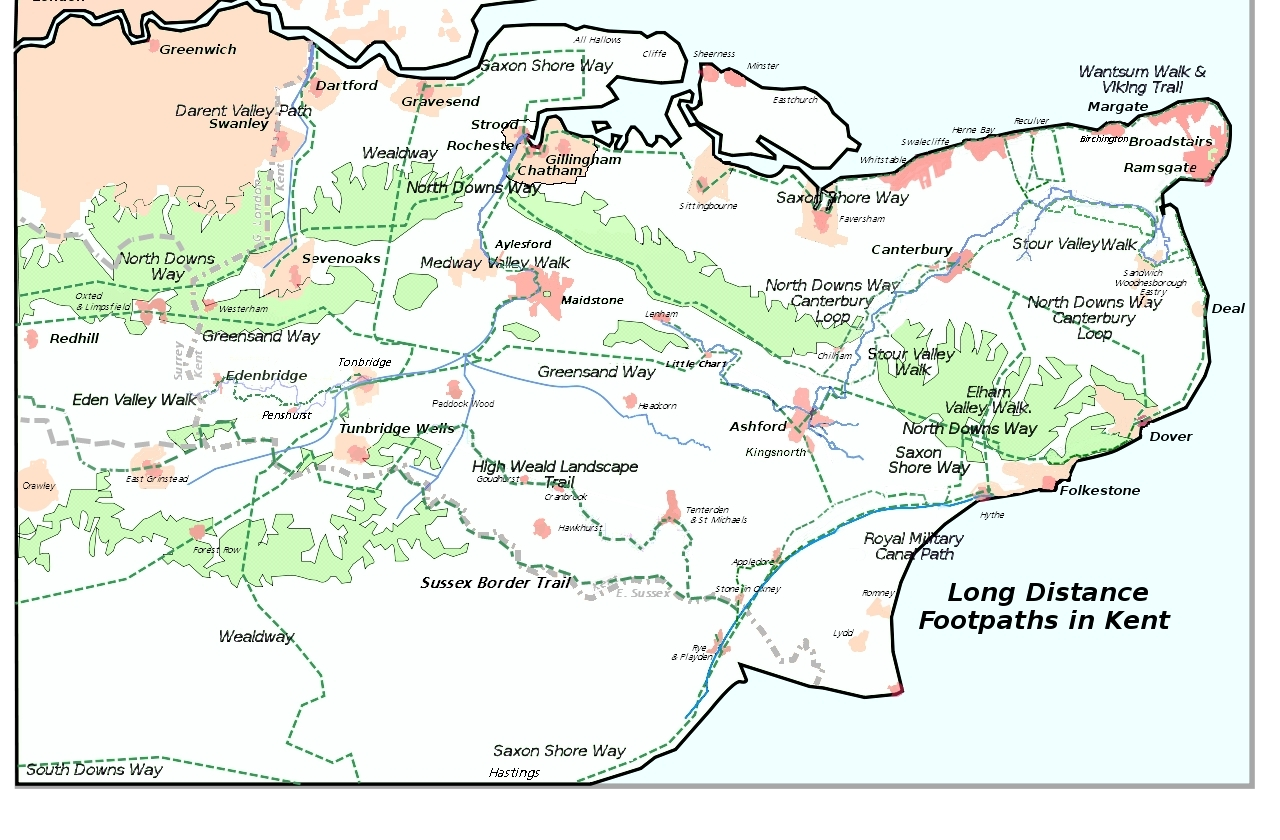
The Royal Military Canal Path, and the other long-distance footpaths in Kent

The Royal Military Canal Path is a long-distance path in England, mainly following the Royal Military Canal. Its end points are Seabrook, Kent (51.0720°N 1.1221°E), and Pett Level, East Sussex (50.8887°N 0.6840°E), and it runs for 27 miles (43 km). It is a canal-side path and fringes the northern edge of Romney Marsh. The canal is an early-19th-century defence against a possible invasion by Napoleon, and it is a Scheduled Ancient Monument and a SSSI. Links are made with the Saxon Shore Way at Appledore and West Hythe.

== See also ==
- Greensand Way
