= Harwich Redoubt =

Fort built in 1808-10 to defend Harwich from revolutionary France

Coordinates: 51.9419°N 1.2889°E

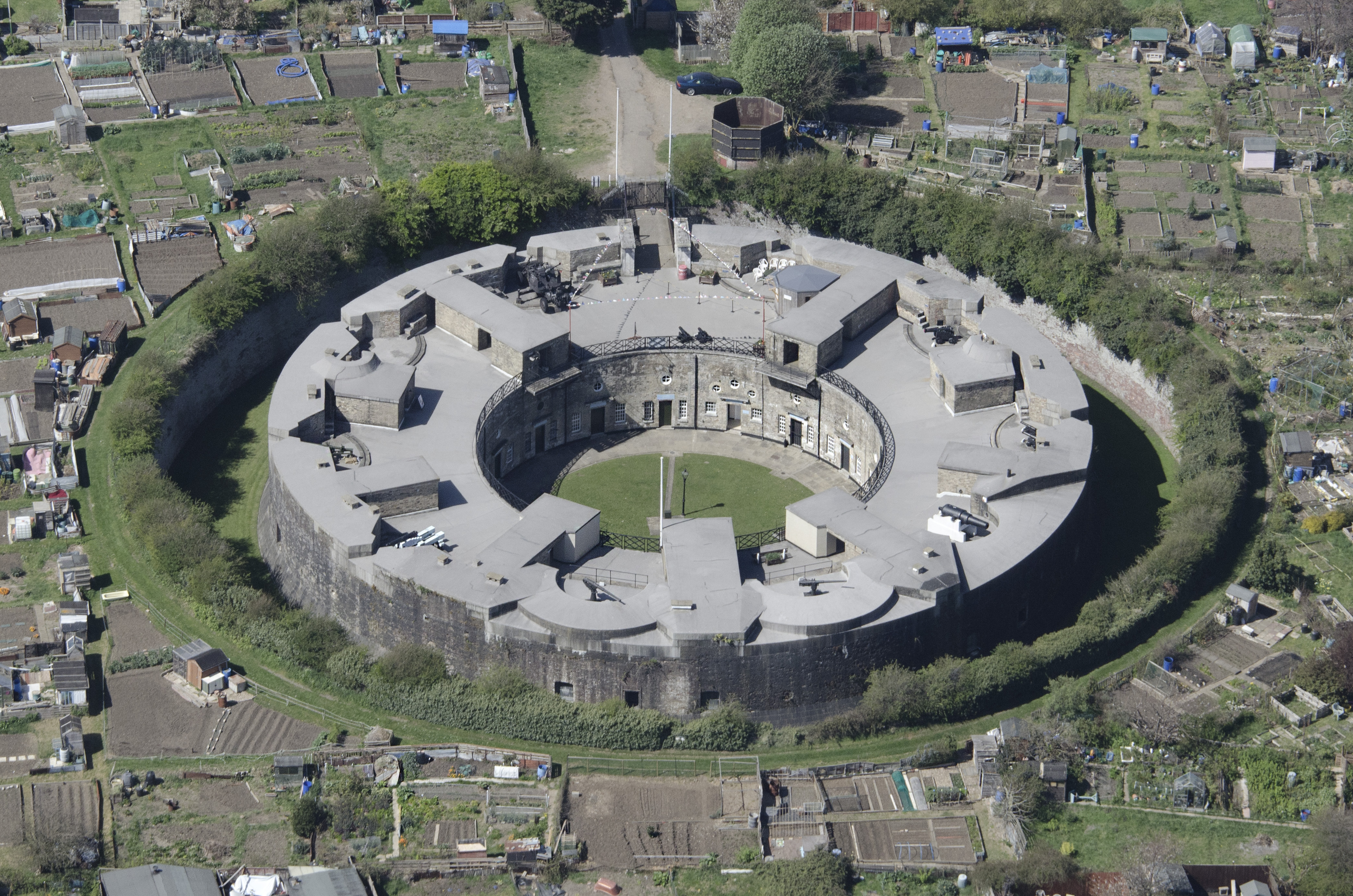
Harwich Redoubt aerial view

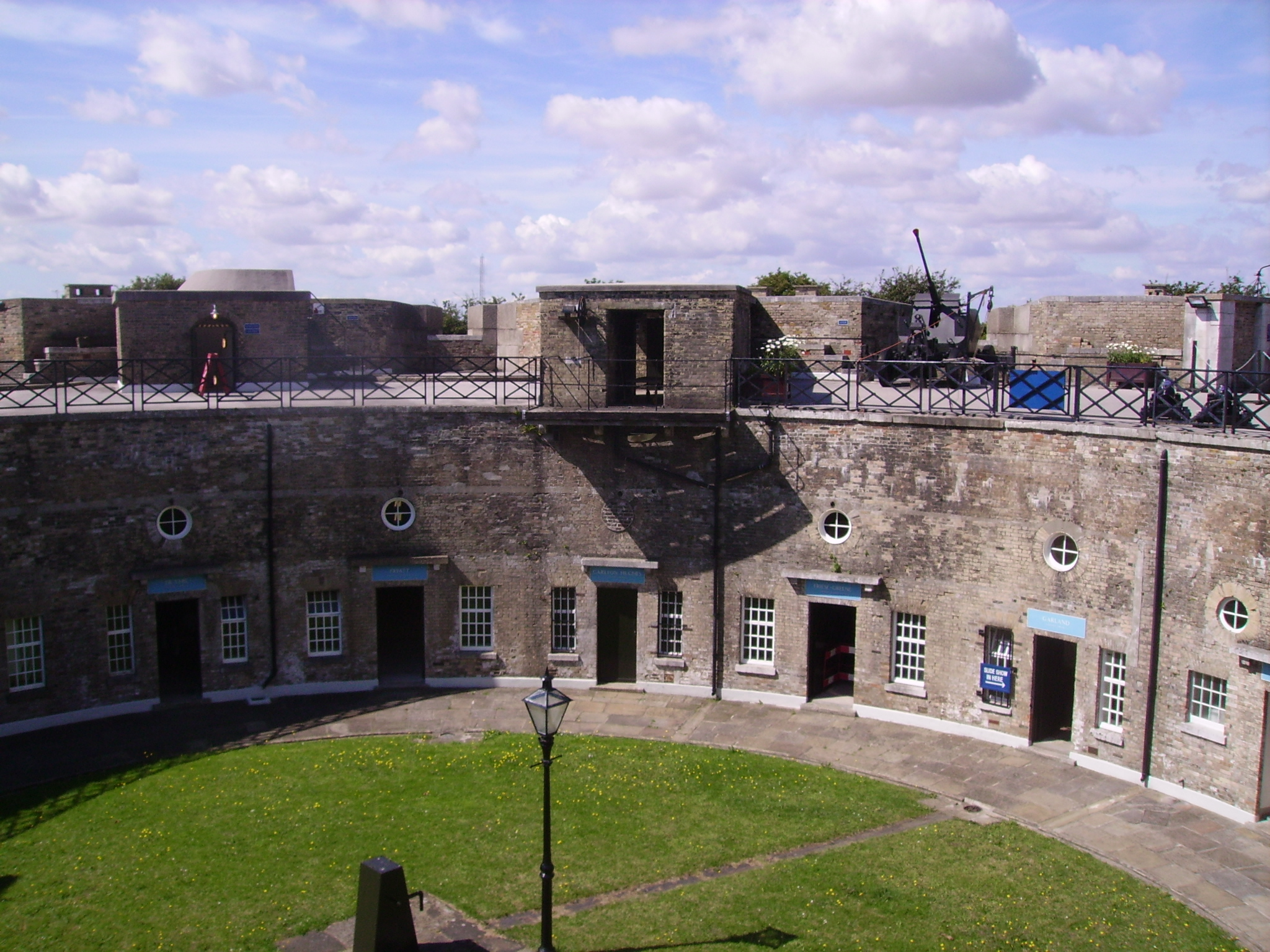
View of the Harwich Redoubt as it is today

Harwich Redoubt is a circular fort built in 1808 to defend the port of Harwich, Essex from Napoleonic invasion. The Harwich Society opens it to the public.

== Construction ==
The Redoubt was built between 1808 and 1810 to protect the port of Harwich against the threat of Napoleonic invasion. It was part of the scheme proposed in 1805 that included the construction of 55 Martello Towers on the East Anglian coast, although 29 were actually built. Although similar in design to the earlier Dymchurch Redoubt and Eastbourne Redoubt, Harwich Redoubt differed in being designed to mount ten, rather than eleven guns.

The redoubt was built on a hilltop just outside the town, giving an unrestricted field of fire across the estuaries of the River Stour and the River Orwell which form the entrance to the harbour, and allowed interlocking fire with the guns of Landguard Fort on the opposite shore. The construction was supervised by Major Alexander Bryce of the Royal Engineers at an estimated cost of £32,000.

== Description ==
Harwich Redoubt is built mainly from brick with stone details, and is circular in shape, about 61 metres (200 ft) in diameter, with a central parade ground 26 metres (85 ft) across. The ground floor consists of 18 casemates or vaulted chambers radiating from the parade ground. These casemates were used as barrack accommodation, stores, ablutions and latrines, and a cookhouse. Two of them form the magazine and shell store; hoists lifted ammunition from the lower level to the gun emplacements, which are on a terreplein or gun platform formed by the roof of the casemates, which has ten embrasures for cannon. The ditch is some 16 metres (52 ft) wide and 7 metres (23 ft) deep, with a brick counterscarp wall set a little lower than the level of the parapet of the gun platform so as to protect the scarp wall from enemy fire.

== Military service ==
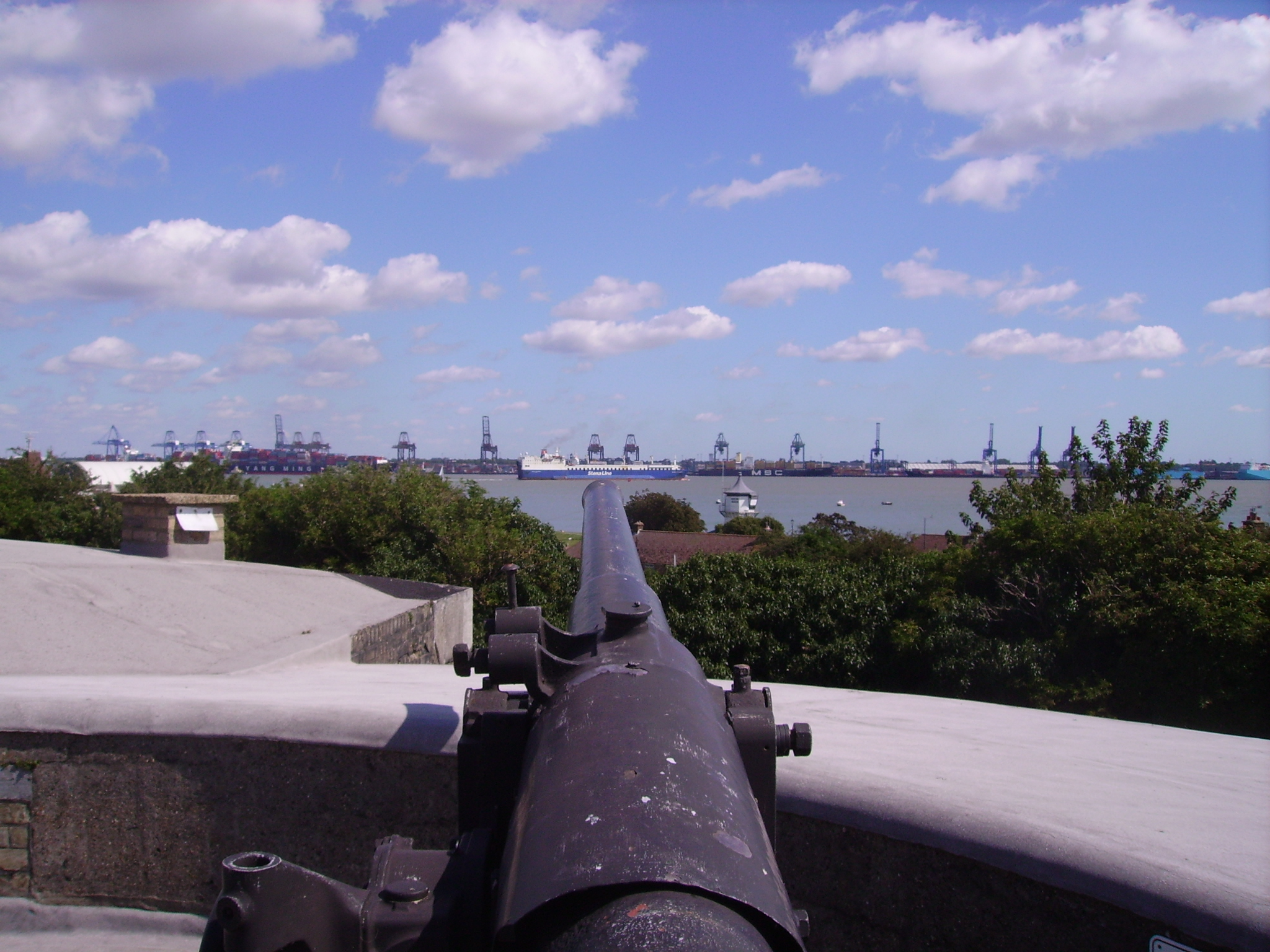
View from the Harwich Redoubt, showing its commanding position over the estuary

Originally armed with ten 24-pounder cannon, the Redoubt was remodelled in order to accommodate increasingly heavy guns, as technology and the perceived threat changed. In 1861–2, work was carried out to accommodate 68-pounder cannon, and the emplacements were strengthened (by adding granite facing) to withstand improved enemy artillery. Only a decade later in 1872, three of the emplacements were altered to take enormous 12 ton RML (rifled muzzle loading) guns. In 1903, three emplacements received 12-pounder QF (quick firing) guns.

Despite this ongoing modernisation, the Redoubt never fired a shot in anger. It is also probable that its strategic importance declined towards the end of the 19th century with the construction of the more powerful Beacon Hill Battery just to the south. In the 1920s the area around the Redoubt - previously kept clear to provide fields of fire - was bought by the Town Council. This land is used for allotments. The Redoubt itself was allowed to fall into disrepair.

The Redoubt was briefly taken back into military service during World War II, when it was used as an anti-aircraft site and it also served as a detention centre for British troops awaiting trial. Examples of the graffiti left by the soldiers can still be seen in some of the rooms.

Following World War II the Redoubt was used by the British Civil Defence organisation, who used it until they were disbanded. That was the end of the Redoubt's military service.

== Restoration ==
Following a listing as an Ancient Monument, the restoration of the Harwich Redoubt began in July 1969 and has continued until the present day. When restoration began, one of the 9-inch 12 ton RML guns was discovered buried in the (dry) moat - it had been pushed in when it became obsolete, as they were too large and solidly constructed to be broken up for scrap.

Currently open as a museum, the Redoubt is the largest ancient monument in the UK being restored by a voluntary group. In addition to some of the original guns that armed the Redoubt, including the 9-inch RML, there are a number of other guns on display. Around the parade ground on the lower level, the various rooms are either fitted out in reconstruction of how they might have looked, or are used as display rooms for other exhibitions. Exhibitions include a large number of replica firearms. Battle re-enactments and other events are held during the summer months.
