= Palmarsh =

Suburb of Hythe, Kent, United Kingdom

Coordinates: 51.063°N 1.048°E

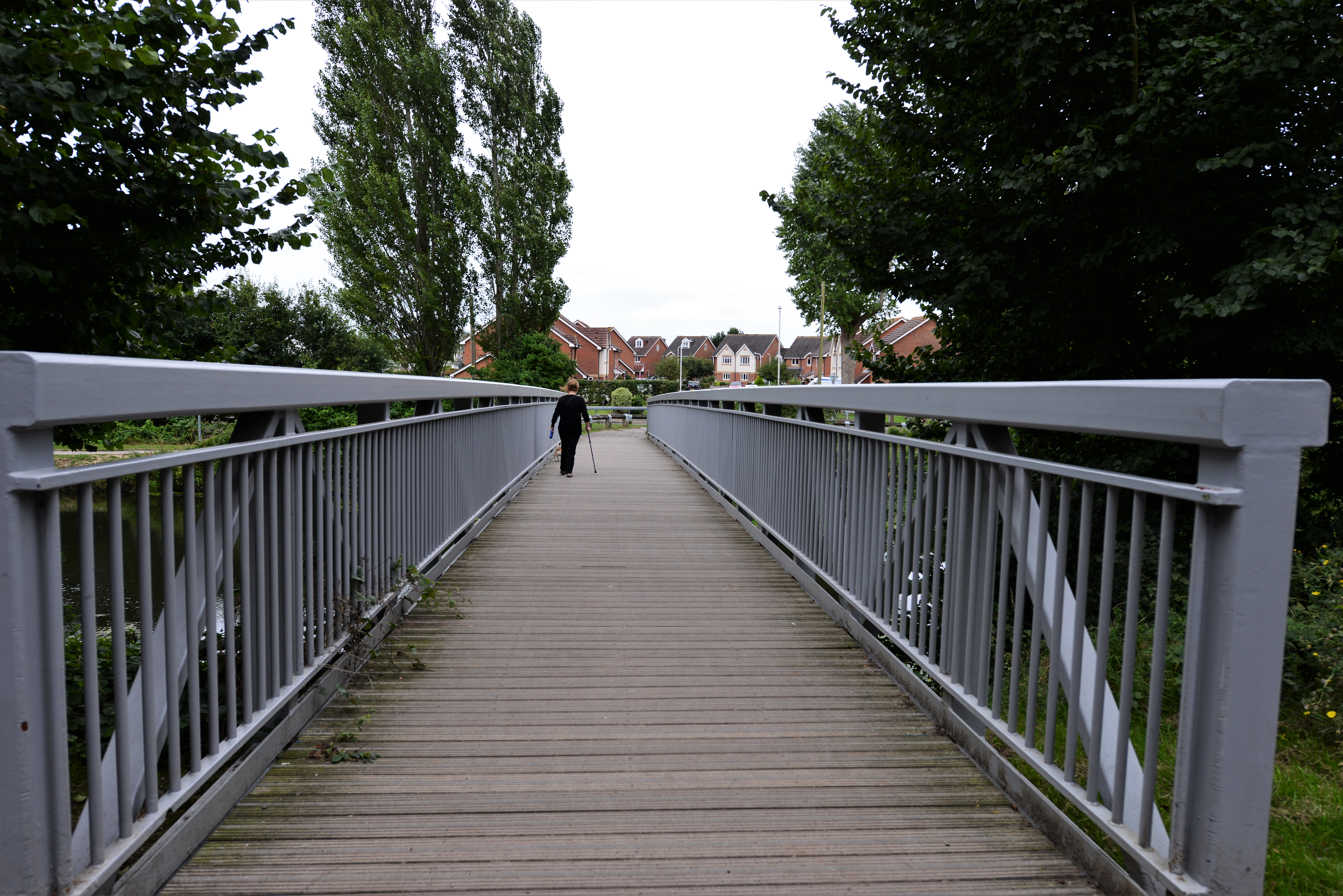
Palmarsh Footbridge

Palmarsh is a community (OS grid reference TR1333) in Folkestone and Hythe district, in the County of Kent, England. In origin it was a hamlet on the edge of the Romney Marsh, but modern development to the west of Hythe (mostly housing, together with some local shops) in a corridor along the A259 coastal road, has led to the joining together of the ancient town and cinque port of Hythe (to the east) and the rural hamlet of Palmarsh (to the west) in a single conurbation.

== Facilities ==
Palmarsh is served by a Church of England church, known as Holy Cross Church, Palmarsh, which is united with the parish church in Hythe town centre. There is a state primary school. There is a public house called the Prince of Wales. The Royal Military Canal and the Romney, Hythe and Dymchurch Railway both pass through the community. The railway had a short-lived station here, named Prince of Wales halt, which opened in 1927 and closed in 1928. The Dymchurch Redoubt, a Napoleonic fortification and Scheduled Monument, is actually located in Palmarsh, and not the larger town of Dymchurch some two miles further west along the coast, from which it derives its name.

== Economy ==
Palmarsh attracts holidaymakers, and there are several campsites and guest houses. It includes the western end of a large Ministry of Defence firing range, with associated military activity and army personnel. The largest single industry throughout the 1960s, 1970s, and 1980s was the Nickoll's Quarry (also known as Palmarsh gravel pits) where large quantities of gravel were excavated and sold by Nickoll's. The resulting deep quarry pits, now flooded, have been turned into a watersports centre, where there is much boating, fishing, and water skiing activity, as well as bird-watching.

== Future development ==
Plans have been developed throughout the 1990s and 2000s for a large housing development at the Nickoll's Quarry end of Palmarsh. Plans have advanced slowly, partly due to local opposition, and partly due to allegations of corruption in the planning process for the proposed development, including allegations of official objections being hidden from publication.
