= West Hythe =

Hamlet in Kent, England

Coordinates: 51.068°N 1.032°E

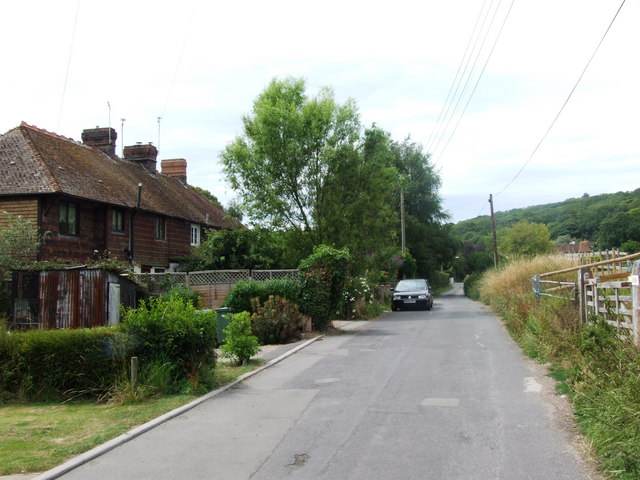

- Location within Kent
- Population: 566
- District: Folkestone and Hythe
- Shire county: Kent
- Region: South East
- Country: England
- Sovereign state: United Kingdom
- Post town: HYTHE
- Postcode district: CT21
- Dialling code: 01303
- Police: Kent
- Fire: Kent
- Ambulance: South East Coast
- UK Parliament: Folkestone and Hythe

West Hythe is a hamlet and former civil parish, now in the parish of Hythe, in the Folkestone and Hythe district, in Kent, England, near Palmarsh and a few miles west of the cinque port town of Hythe. In 2020 it had an estimated population of 566.

== Location ==
Modern settlement is mostly on the plain south of the Royal Military Canal, and immediately north and north-west of Palmarsh, but the ancient parish church (in ruins) stands at the foot of the escarpment north of the canal, where much of the ancient village was located.

Modern development to the west of Hythe (mostly housing, together with some local shops) in a corridor along the A259 coastal road, has led to the joining together of the ancient town of Hythe and the rural hamlet of Palmarsh in a single urban conurbation, which itself reaches almost to the West Hythe community.

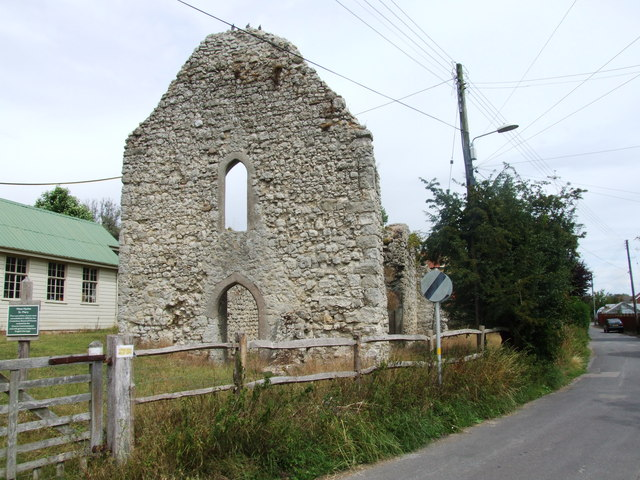
The ruins of St Mary's Church

== Parish church ==
The ancient parish church, dedicated to St Mary, is disused and in ruins. Nonetheless, it is listed as a Grade II monument, and is a structure monitored by English Heritage. It was constructed in the twelfth century and heavily rebuilt in the fourteenth century. The British Listed Buildings website reports that the church was burnt down in 1620. There is some evidence that St Mary's may have been, in origin, a minster church.

== Botolph's Bridge ==
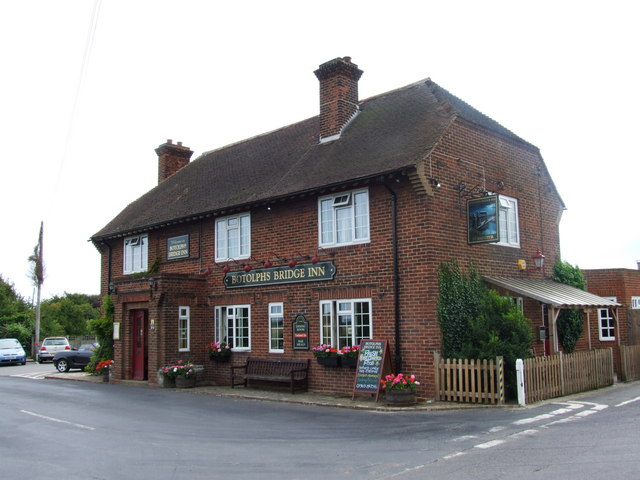
The Botolph's Bridge Inn

Botolph's Bridge is a small hamlet, consisting of a few family homes and a public house named "Botolph's Bridge Inn" (formerly "The Botolph's Bridge"). The hamlet is associated with West Hythe, with which it shares community activity and history. Its name is derived from the Saxon monk and evangelist St Botolph. A railway station formerly served the community on the Romney, Hythe and Dymchurch Railway, half a mile to the south; the railway still operates, but Botolph's Bridge Halt railway station closed in 1939.

Botolph's connection with the community is unclear, and the name may be derived from the saint's patronage of farming. It is also possible that the saint visited the area during one of his known preaching trips from his native East Anglia to the South Saxon people. A chapel dedicated to St Botolph formerly stood on Folkestone's East Cliff, 7 miles to the east, and a group of three churches dedicated to St Botolph are located in West Sussex, 70 miles to the west.

According to local legend, the name Botolph's Bridge is derived from the time of the Danish invasions of eastern England, or shortly thereafter, when Botolph's body was exhumed and carried to an unknown location by monks of Ikenhoe. The legend reports that the body was brought to West Hythe and there guided by a mysterious light from above to the only safe crossing of a deep drainage dyke, at the place now known as Botolph's Bridge. The legend is represented artistically on the pub sign of the Botolph's Bridge Inn.

== History ==
In 1881 the parish had a population of 138. On 24 March 1888 the parish was abolished and merged with St Leonard's, Hythe and Burmarsh.

== See also ==
- Lympne Castle
- Portus Lemanis
- Botolph's Bridge Halt railway station
