= Botolph's Bridge Halt railway station =

Disused railway station in England

Coordinates: 51°03′22″N 1°01′50″E

Botolph's Bridge Halt
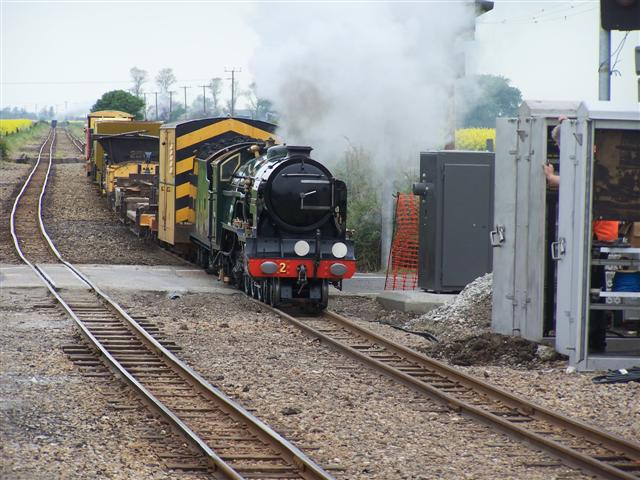
- A works train passing the site of the halt

General information
- Location: Romney Marsh, Folkestone & Hythe; England
- Platforms: 2

Other information
- Status: Disused

History
- Original company: RHDR

Key dates
- 1927: Opened
- 1939: Station closed to passengers
Location

Botolphs Bridge Halt railway station was a little-used station on the Romney, Hythe and Dymchurch Railway in Kent, England.

Botolphs Bridge or Botolph's Bridge is a hamlet on the Romney Marsh, consisting of a small group of family homes and a public house. Although the railway passes some distance from the settlement, the long road from the hamlet to the coast is called "Botolphs Bridge Road", and intersects the railway at a level crossing. Here a small halt was provided when the line opened in 1927, with a single wooden waiting shelter for the convenience of passengers.

The halt was closed in 1939 due to very low traffic figures. The manner of its closure was somewhat spectacular, and well reported locally at the time. Captain Howey, the railway's founder and principal shareholder, declared the station closed, instructed train drivers not to stop there, and then set fire to the wooden shelter. With no public warning of the impending closure, the flames and smoke prompted an emergency call to the Fire Brigade, who turned out an appliance and crew. The firemen were very surprised to arrive on scene and discover the burning building's owner with a box of matches.

== Gallery ==
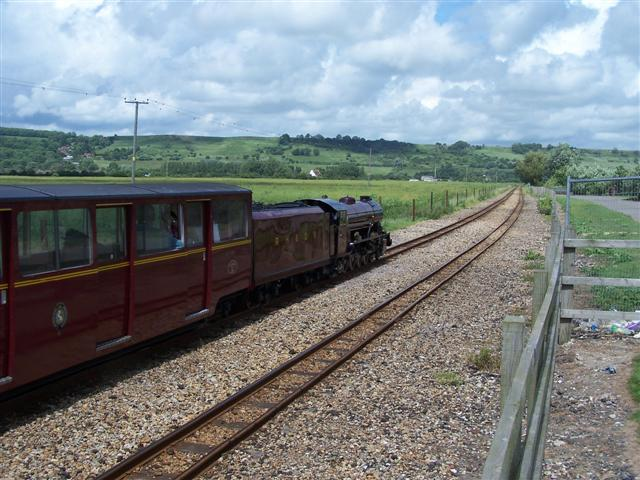
No. 5 Hercules heading for Hythe

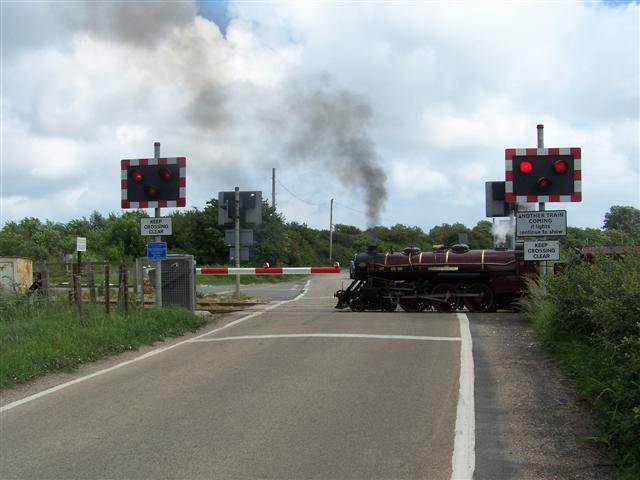
No. 9 Winston Churchill crossing the level crossing

Preceding station	Heritage railways	Following station
Former service
Burmarsh Road Line open, station closed towards Dungeness	Romney, Hythe & Dymchurch Railway	Prince of Wales Halt Line open, station closed towards Hythe
