= Eastbourne Redoubt =

Circular coastal defence fort at Eastbourne, East Sussex, England

Coordinates: 50.773974°N 0.300437°E

- Eastbourne, United Kingdom
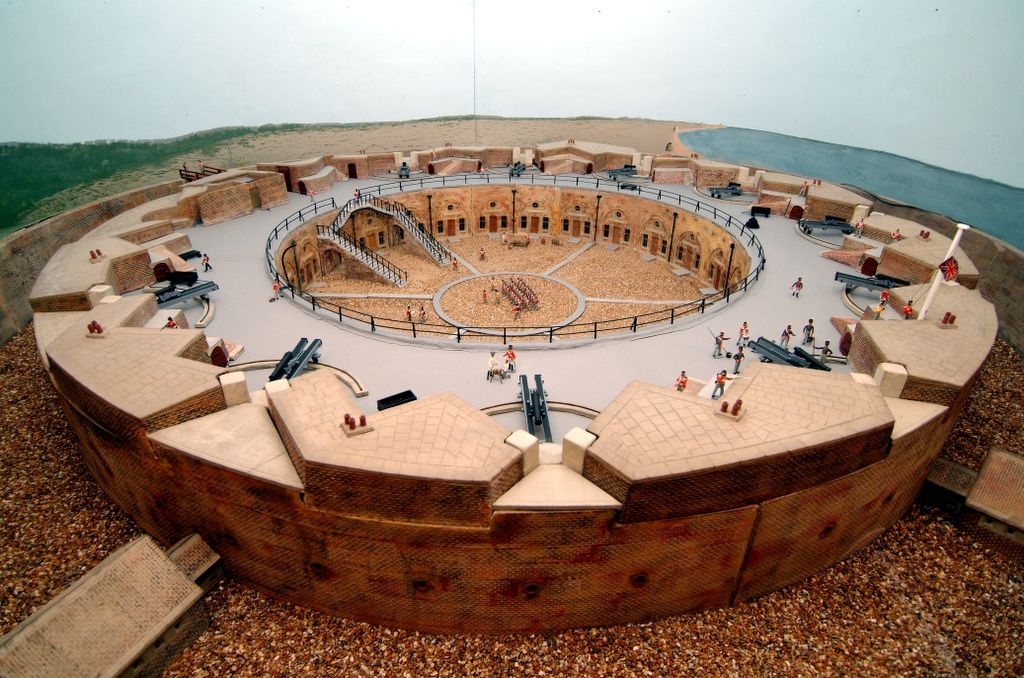
- A model of the Redoubt Fortress on display at the museum

Site information
- Type: Redoubt
- Owner: Eastbourne Borough Council
- Open to the public: Yes
- Website: eastbournemuseums.co.uk

Site history
- Built: 1804

Eastbourne Redoubt is a circular coastal defence fort at Eastbourne, East Sussex, on the south coast of England. It was built in 1805 as part of the British anti-invasion preparations during the Napoleonic Wars. The building is now owned by the local authority and was briefly open to the public before being closed in 2021 due to Covid-19 restrictions and structural safety concerns.

== Description ==
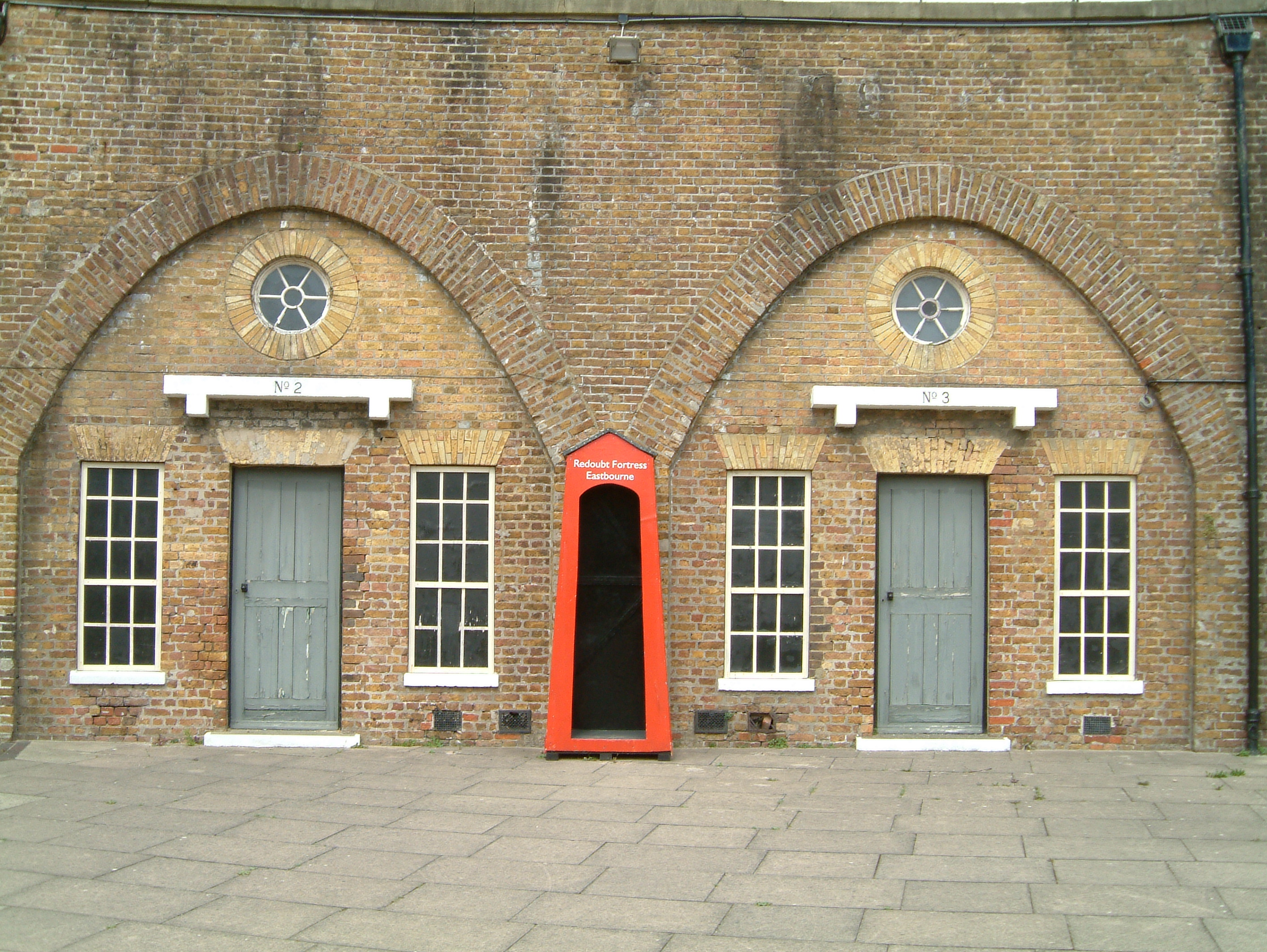
Redoubt Fortress Eastbourne, Casemates No.2 & No.3

The redoubt is a circular structure, measuring 224 feet (68 metres) in diameter and is built almost entirely of brick with some granite facing. The lower tier is composed of a ring of 24 casemates or vaulted chambers, which open into a central parade ground. Casemate 11 was the main magazine for the redoubt, casemate 8 was modified in the 1870s as a cook house and casemates 23 and 24 were altered in the 1880s to provide a detention room and two cells.

The upper tier above the casemates forms the terreplein or gun platform, which has a tall parapet pierced by granite-faced embrasures for eleven guns. Beside each gun position is an L-shaped expense magazine which held a supply of ammunition for the guns to use in combat and could also be used as a shelter for the gun crews during an enemy bombardment. The low roof of these magazines forms a banquette or fire step so that the garrison could fire their muskets over the parapet in the event of an infantry attack. The parapet is also pierced by the main gate, which was originally the only access to the redoubt.

The redoubt is surrounded by a ditch or dry moat which is 30 feet (9 metres) from the top of the parapet and 25 feet (7 metres) wide. On the far side of the moat, a glacis or earth ramp slopes away to ground level. Both the moat and the glacis have been removed on the seaward side during construction of a sea wall and promenade in 1890. The floor of the ditch is traversed by five caponiers or covered galleries with loopholes that allowed the defenders to fire at any attackers who had reached that point. These are unique in any of the circular redoubts and are thought to have been added in the mid-19th century. Access to the main gate of the redoubt is across a wooden drop bridge, which is a modern reconstruction of the original, built in 2003 with help from the Royal Engineers. A second entrance from the ditch was created in 1957 by inserting a large doorway through the scarp wall into one of the casemates.

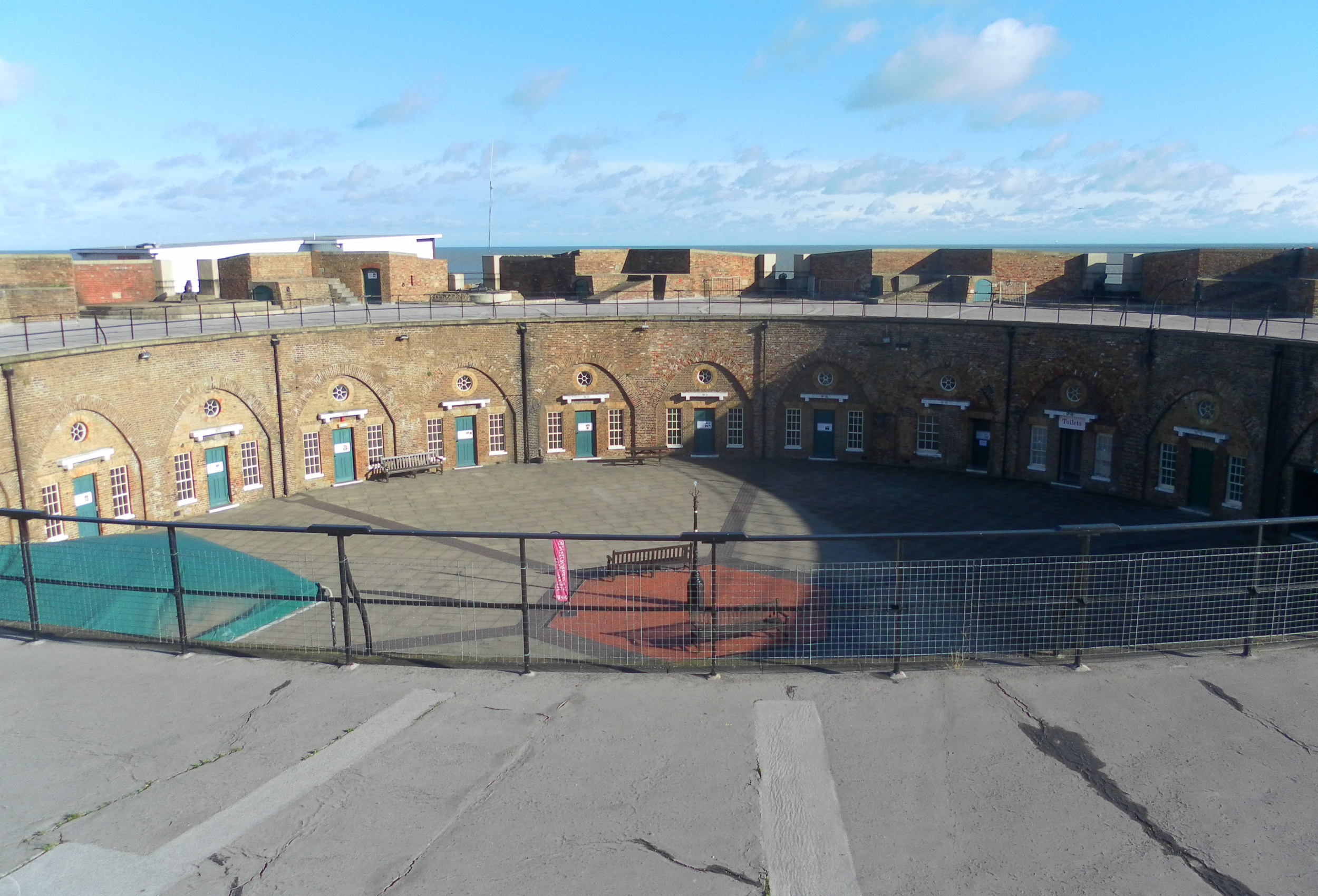
View across the redoubt from the rampart, showing the circular parade ground, the doors and windows of the casemates and the terreplein or gun platform above them.

== History ==
=== Origin ===
The decision to build the redoubt was made at a conference held in Rochester on 21 October 1804, to discuss defence against Napoleon's planned invasion of the United Kingdom, preparations for which were gaining momentum on the opposite side of the English Channel. The meeting, which was attended by the Prime Minister, William Pitt the Younger, agreed to adopt a revolutionary scheme to build a chain of mutually-supporting circular artillery towers along a stretch of the Channel coast where the French were thought to be most likely to land. The scheme had been devised by Captain William Henry Ford of the Royal Engineers and championed by Brigadier-General William Twiss who commanded the Royal Engineer Southern District. The original plan called for 83 Martello towers, each mounting a single heavy gun, at intervals along the coast and three 11-gun towers at Sea Houses (Eastbourne), Rye Harbour and Dymchurch. In the event, 74 Martello Towers were actually built and plans for the 11-gun tower at Rye were abandoned. The 11-gun towers, which came to be known as "circular forts" or "grand redoubts", were intended to act as barracks and stores depots for the rest of the Martello chain, as well as formidable fortresses in their own right. A third redoubt was later constructed at Harwich in Essex to support the Martello chain built to defend the east coast; although broadly similar, it differs in some details from the south coast redoubts.

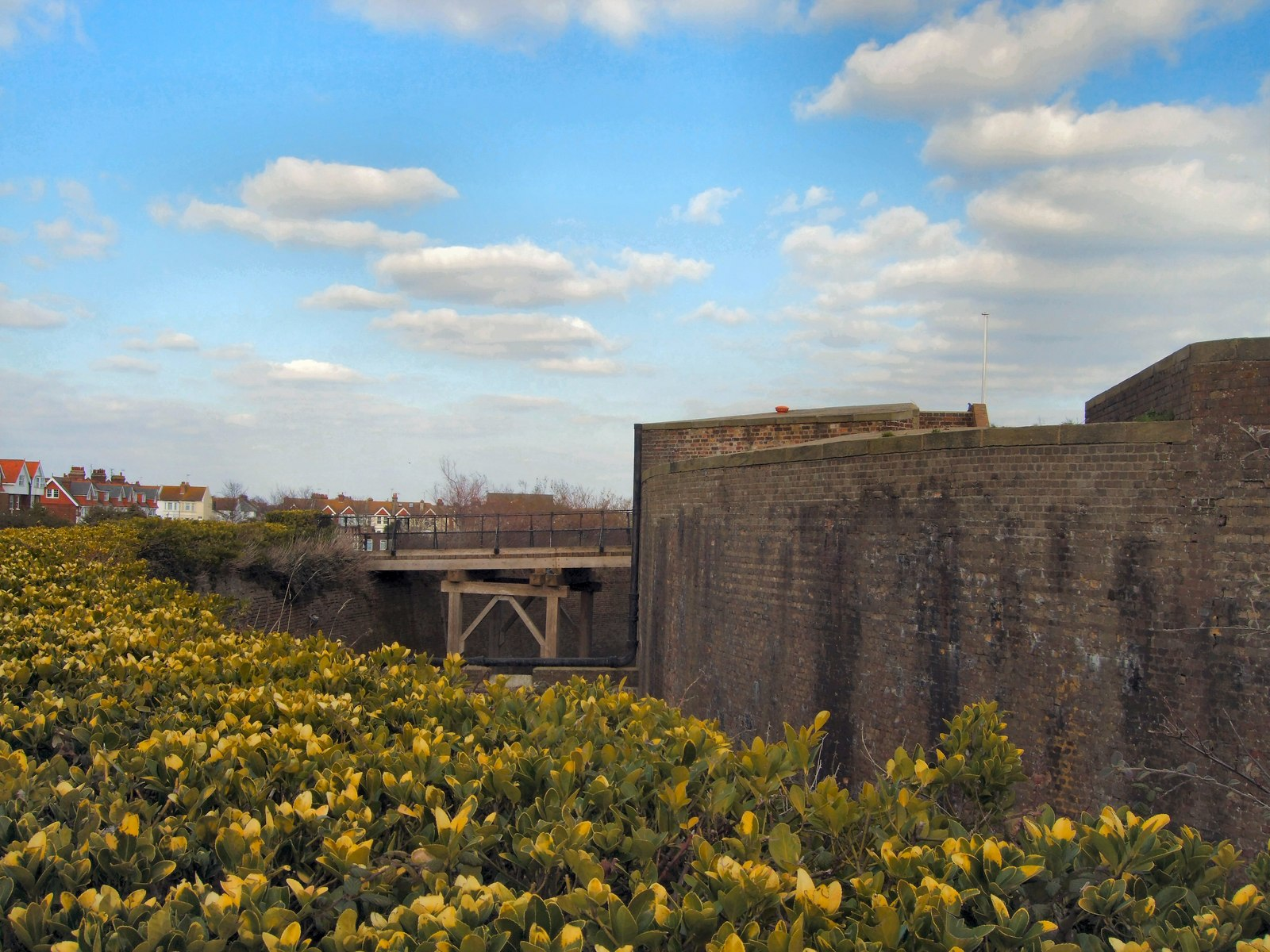
View of the redoubt from the glacis, showing the ditch and the reconstructed drop bridge.

=== Construction and the Napoleonic Wars ===
The contract to build the redoubt at Eastbourne was awarded to William Hobson. Five million bricks were brought around the coast by barge from London for the project and others were made locally. Work started on 16 April 1805, but a report by Brigadier-General Twiss to the Board of Ordnance in May 1808 recommended that the money to settle Hobson's account be withheld until all the work was completed. The structure was built on a raft of compacted chalk laid directly onto the natural shingle. It was constructed almost entirely of brick, over 50,000 being used in a single course.

Cavities within the structure were filled with shingle. The redoubt was initially armed with 24-pounder guns on traversing carriages; although there are embrasures for 11 guns, only 10 appear to have been mounted. These were replaced shortly afterwards by longer ranged 36-pounder guns, after fears the redoubt could be bombarded at a distance by heavier French weapons. By the time that the redoubt had been fully armed and garrisoned, the likelihood of an invasion had become very remote and the guns were only fired in anger once; in 1812 two shots were fired at a passing French warship but missed.

=== Later 19th-century developments ===
By the 1830s, Europe was experiencing a long peaceful period and the garrison consisted of only seven gunners and a gate keeper, together with their families. The main role of the redoubt was as a barracks rather than a fortress, with troops being stationed there for a few weeks at a time while using nearby training facilities. Although it was intended for 350 men, it is thought unlikely that more than 200 could be accommodated at any one time. Despite this, the armament of the fort was progressively improved throughout the century. In 1853, the 36-pounders were replaced by 68-pounder smoothbore guns. In 1859, the Royal Commission on the Defence of the United Kingdom which had been set up by Lord Palmerston to review Britain's fortifications, reported that the redoubts and Martello towers were "not an important element of security against attack". Nevertheless, by 1873, the armament had been increased to four 8 inch rifled muzzle loaders and three 110-pounder rifled breech loaders, together with two of the older 68-pounders. Various improvements were made to the living conditions in the barracks including the addition of a cookhouse in the 1870s and a latrine outside the main gate in the 1880s.

=== The World Wars and later ===
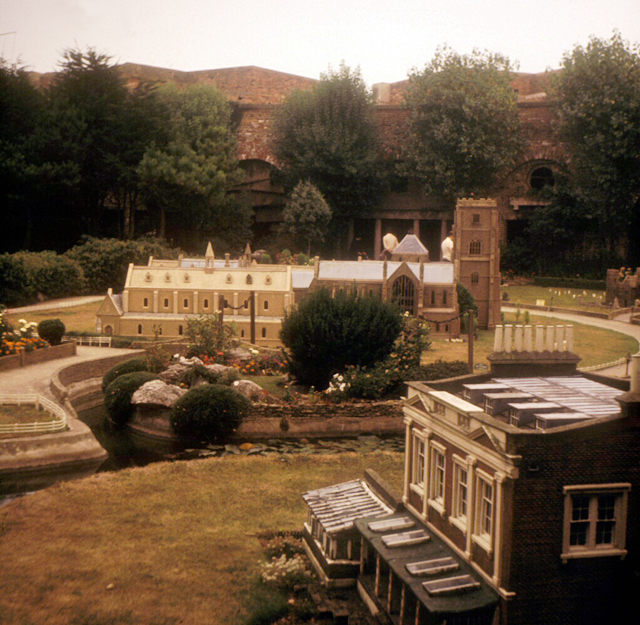
The model village which was an attraction inside the redoubt from 1957 to 1975.

During the First World War the military police used the redoubt as a headquarters and temporary gaol. Following this, Eastbourne Borough Council purchased the redoubt for £150 with the plan to turn it into a venue for leisure activities. The only part of the plan to be implemented was in 1934; the construction of a new bandstand in the gardens just to the west of the redoubt and an associated colonnade to shelter the audience, which was built over part of the moat. During the Second World War, the army requisitioned the building to use for storage. The remaining artillery pieces were sold for scrap.

In 1944, anti-aircraft guns were mounted on the gun platforms to counter passing V-1 flying bombs. In 1957, the redoubt was leased to an entrepreneur named Benjamin White, who created a model village on the parade ground and constructed a new entrance from the moat, with a staircase that gives access from the promenade. The bandstand colonnade was converted into the Blue Grotto Aquarium, which was captured in 3D by VistaScreen. The model village was vandalised and then removed in the 1970s, and the aquarium closed in 1996.

== Access and events ==
As of 2025, the Redoubt Fortress, which includes the regimental museums of the Queen's Royal Irish Hussars and the Royal Sussex Regiment, with the Sussex Combined Services military collection, is currently closed to the public, due to structiral safety concerns. Limited reopening by guided tour only started in August and September 2025.

== See also ==
- Listed buildings in Eastbourne

== Bibliography ==
- Milton, Rosemary; Callaghan, Richard (2004). The Redoubt Fortress and Martello Towers of Eastbourne 1804-2004. Eastbourne Local History Society. ISBN 0-9547647-0-6.
- Chandler, David G.; Beckett, Ian (1994). The Oxford History of the British Army. Oxford University Press. ISBN 0-19-280311-5.
