= Royal Military Canal =

Defensive canal in southern England

Coordinates: 50.977617°N 0.755215°E

Royal Military Canal Path
- Length: 46 kilometres (29 miles)
- Location: United Kingdom
- Use: Hiking
- Elevation gain/loss: 217 m (712 ft)
- Difficulty: Easy

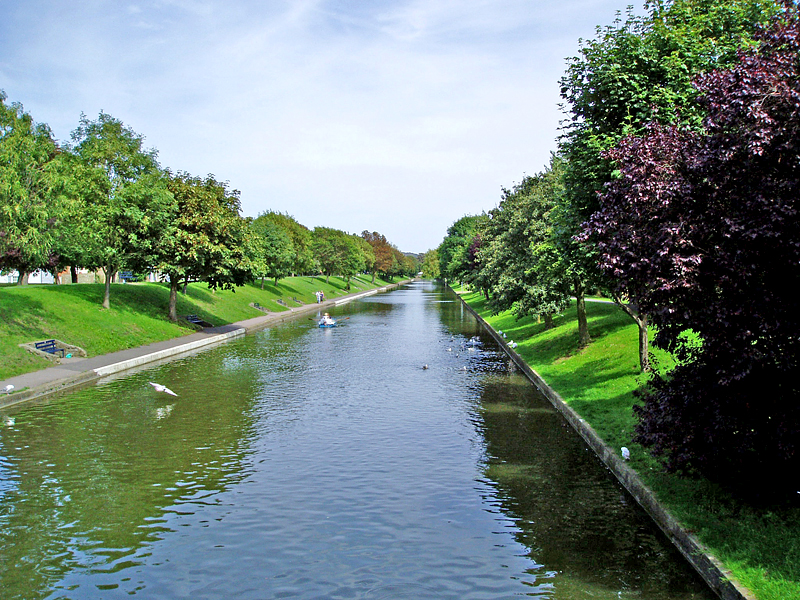
The canal at Hythe

The Royal Military Canal is a canal running for 28 miles (45 km) between Seabrook near Folkestone and Cliff End near Hastings, following the old cliff line bordering Romney Marsh, which was constructed as part of British anti-invasion preparations of 1803–05 against Napoleon's planned invasion of the United Kingdom. It was designed with the intention to tactically contain the potential landing points near to Dungeness, which is approximately 20 miles from Dover and 40 miles from Calais, an area if conquered would provide a direct route to London from the coast.

== History ==
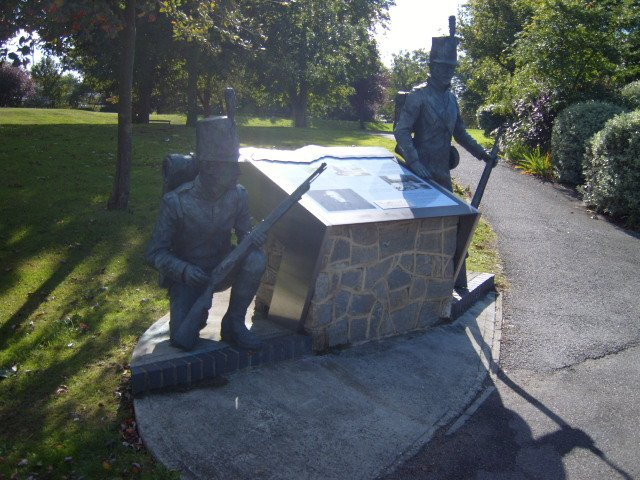
A modern sculpture of soldiers of Royal Staff Corps at Hythe, commemorating the construction of the canal

=== Origin and construction ===
The canal was conceived by Lieutenant-Colonel John Brown of the Royal Staff Corps of field engineers in 1804, during anti-invasion preparations, as a defensible barrier to ensure that a French force could not use the Romney Marsh as a bridgehead. It had previously been assumed that the marsh could be inundated in the event of an invasion, but Brown argued that this would take ten days to implement and would cause massive disruption in the event of a false alarm. At a meeting on 26 September 1804, the Prime Minister, William Pitt the Younger, and the Commander-in-Chief of the Forces, the Duke of York, both enthusiastically endorsed the scheme. John Rennie was appointed consultant engineer, and Pitt personally persuaded the local landowners to agree to the new canal.

Royal Military Canal Act 1807
- Act of Parliament
- Parliament of the United Kingdom
- Long title: An Act for maintaining and preserving a Military Canal and Road, made from Shorncliff in the County of Kent, to Cliff End in the County of Sussex, and for regulating the taking of Rates and Tolls thereon.
- Citation: 47 Geo. 3 Sess. 2. c. 70
- Territorial extent: United Kingdom

Dates
- Royal assent: 13 August 1807
- Commencement: 13 August 1807 (Note: The Acts of Parliament (Commencement) Act 1793.)
Other legislation
Relates to	Royal Military Canal Act 1837

Status: Current legislation

Text of statute as originally enacted

Royal Military Canal Act 1837
- Act of Parliament
- Parliament of the United Kingdom
- Long title: An Act for transferring and vesting the Royal Military Canal, Roads, Towing Paths, and the Ramparts and other Works belonging thereto, and all Estates and Property taken and occupied for the same, in the Counties of Kent and Sussex, and also the Rates and Tolls arising therefrom, in the principal Officers of His Majesty's Ordnance.
- Citation: 7 Will. 4 & 1 Vict. c. 20
- Territorial extent: United Kingdom

Dates
- Royal assent: 30 June 1837
- Commencement: 30 June 1837
Other legislation
Relates to	Royal Military Canal Act 1807; Ordnance Property Act 1821; Ordnance Department Act 1832

Status: Current legislation

Text of statute as originally enacted

Construction was started at Seabrook, near Hythe in Kent on 30 October 1804. By May 1805 only six miles of the canal had been completed; William Pitt intervened and the contractors and Rennie were dismissed. The work was resumed by the Quartermaster-General’s department with Lt-Col. Brown in command. Civilian navvies dug the canal itself, while soldiers built the ramparts. It was constructed in two sections: the longer section starts at Hythe and ends at Iden Lock in East Sussex; the second, smaller section, runs from the foot of Winchelsea Hill to Cliff End. The two sections are linked by the River Rother (Eastern) and River Brede. Artillery batteries were generally located every 500 yards (460 m), where the canal was staggered to create a salient, allowing the guns to enfilade the next stretch of water. A military road was built on the inland side of the canal, and crossings consisted of moveable wooden bridges. Any troops stationed or moving along the military road would have been protected by the earthen bank of the parapet, which was piled up with excavated soil. The canal was completed in April 1809 at a total cost of £234,000; it was hoped that tolls for use of the waterway and road would help to defray the cost. In addition to these works, a number of Martello towers were built to protect the vulnerable sluices that controlled the water level in the canal, being towers numbers 22 to 27 and 30, three of which are still standing.

=== Peacetime use ===
Royal Military Canal Act 1867 (Note: Section 1.)
- Act of Parliament
- Parliament of the United Kingdom
- Long title: An Act to authorize a Sale or Lease of the Royal Military Canal and its collateral Works; and for other Purposes.
- Citation: 30 & 31 Vict. c. 140
- Territorial extent: United Kingdom

Dates
- Royal assent: 20 August 1867
- Commencement: 20 August 1867

Status: Current legislation

Text of statute as originally enacted

Despite the fact that the canal never saw military action, it was used to try to control smuggling from Romney Marsh. Guard houses were constructed at each bridge along its length. This met with limited success because of corrupt guards. Although a barge service was established from Hythe to Rye, the canal was abandoned in 1877 and leased to the Lords of the Level of Romney Marsh.

=== World War II ===
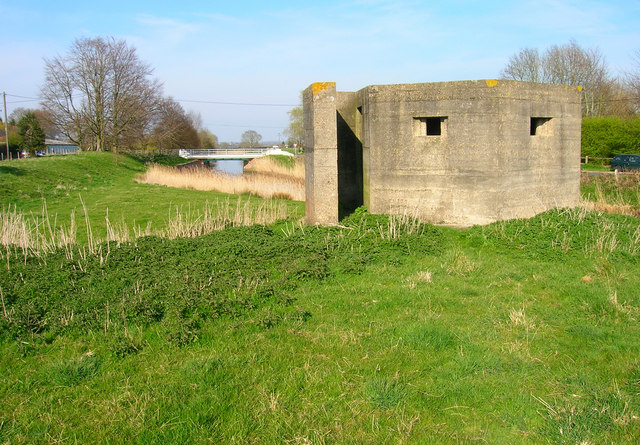
One of the numerous surviving pillboxes built on the Napoleonic era rampart of the canal in 1940.

During the early stages of World War II, during preparations for a threatened German invasion, the canal was manned by 31st Independent Brigade Group, who fortified each salient with a concrete pillbox and barbed wire entanglements; numerous pillboxes survive today. In the German invasion plan, codenamed Operation Sea Lion, the paratroopers of the 7th Flieger-Division were tasked with a parachute landing to secure crossing points across the Royal Military Canal on the first day of the invasion.

== The canal today ==
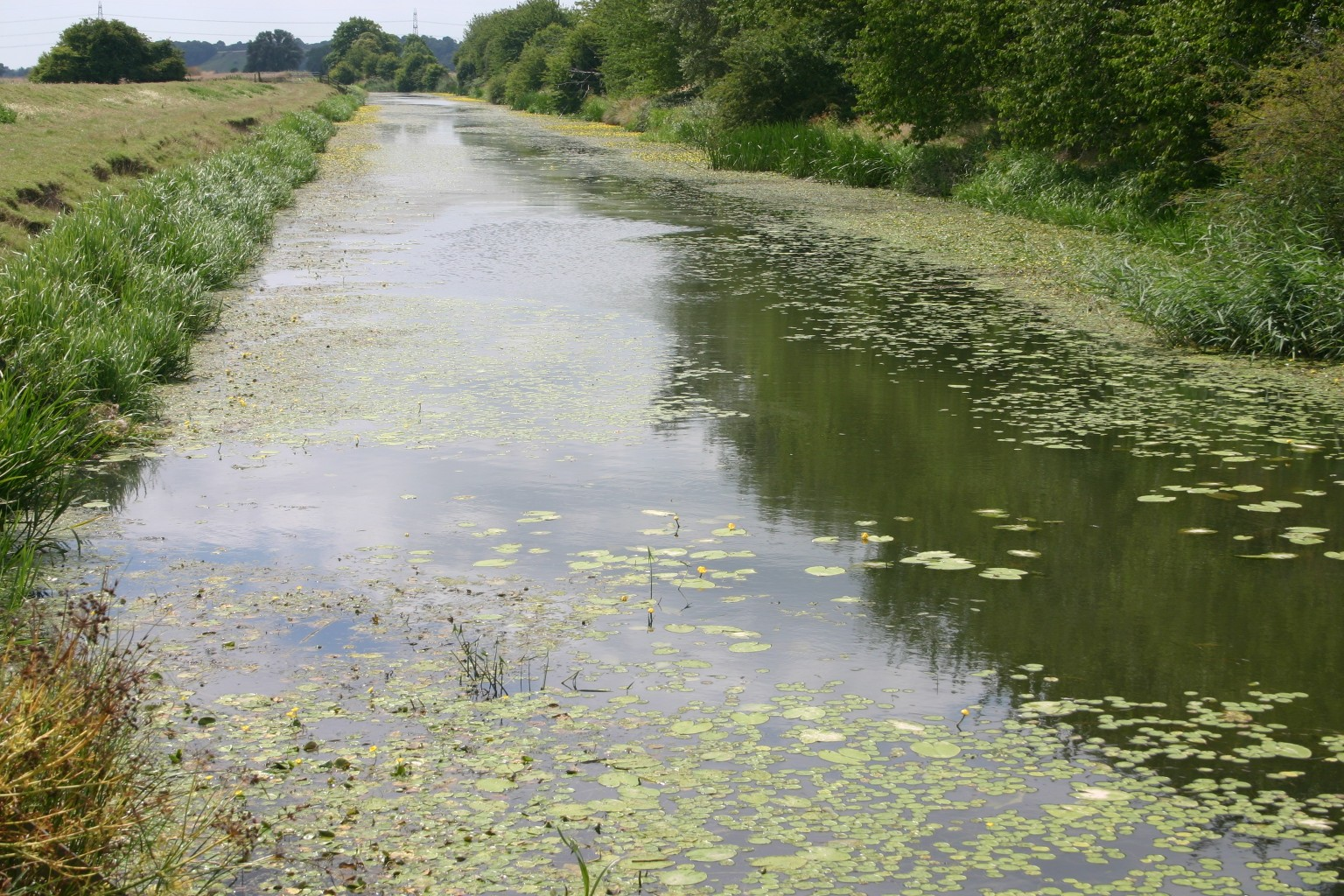
A view over the canal near Rye

A public path runs alongside the entire length of the canal, forming part of the longer 163-mile (262 km) Saxon Shore Way. Aside from being historically significant in its own right, the path passes by numerous WW II pillboxes and the unusual acoustic mirrors, the historic cinque port towns of Hythe, Winchelsea, and Rye, the 12th century St Rumwold's church, and Lympne and Camber castles.

The canal is an important environmental site, and passes through several Sites of Special Scientific Interest. The Environment Agency is the navigation authority and uses the waterway to manage water levels on Romney Marsh and Walland Marsh. It is important for fish and other wildlife, including kingfishers, dragonflies, and marsh frogs.

== See also ==
- Canals of the United Kingdom
- History of the British canal system
- British anti-invasion preparations of 1803–1805

== Bibliography ==
- Foot, William (2006). Beaches, fields, streets, and hills… : the anti-invasion landscapes of England, 1940. York: Council for British Archaeology. ISBN 1-902771-53-2.
- Hadfield, Charles (1969). The Canals of South and South-East England. David and Charles. ISBN 978-0-7153-4693-8.
