= The Sinister Monk =

1965 film

- Directed by: Harald Reinl
- Written by: Jochen Joachim Bartsch; Fred Denger; based on the play The Terror by Edgar Wallace
- Produced by: Horst Wendlandt; Preben Philipsen
- Starring: Karin Dor; Harald Leipnitz; Ilse Steppat
- Cinematography: Ernst W. Kalinke
- Edited by: Jutta Hering
- Music by: Peter Thomas
- Production company: Rialto Film
- Distributed by: Constantin Film
- Release date: 17 December 1965
- Running time: 85 minutes
- Country: West Germany
- Language: German

The Sinister Monk (German: Der unheimliche Mönch) is a 1965 West German thriller film directed by Harald Reinl and starring Karin Dor, Harald Leipnitz and Siegfried Lowitz. It is based on the 1927 play The Terror by Edgar Wallace and was part of a very successful series of German films inspired by his works.

It was shot at the Spandau Studios in Berlin with location shooting in London, Hamburg and Hamelin in Lower Saxony. The film's sets were designed by the art directors Walter Kutz and Wilhelm Vorwerg.

== Cast ==
- Karin Dor as Gwendolin
- Harald Leipnitz as Inspector Bratt
- Siegfried Lowitz as Sir Richard
- Siegfried Schürenberg as Sir John
- Ilse Steppat as Lady Patricia
- Dieter Eppler as William
- Hartmut Reck as Ronny
- Kurt Waitzmann as Cunning
- Rudolf Schündler as Mr. Short
- Kurd Pieritz as Monsieur d'Arol
- Uta Levka as Lola
- Dunja Rajter as Dolores
- Susanne Hsiao as Mai Ling
- Uschi Glas as Mary
- Eddi Arent as Pedell Smith
- Walter Echtz as Mr. Smith / Monk
- Erik Radolf as Servant
- Wilhelm Vorwerg as Notary

== Production ==
It is the fourth film adaptation of the play The Terror by Edgar Wallace. Earlier versions were made in 1928, 1934, and 1938.

Cinematography took place from 6 October to 17 November 1965 at London and Hameln (or Hamelin).

== Reception ==
The FSK gave the film a rating of 16 and up and found it not appropriate for screenings on public holidays.

== Bibliography ==
- Bergfelder, Tim (2005). International Adventures: German Popular Cinema and European Co-productions in the 1960s. Berghahn Books. ISBN 978-1-57181-539-2.
- Donnelly, Kevin J.; Hayward, Philip, eds. (2013). Music in Science Fiction Television: Tuned to the Future. Routledge. ISBN 978-0-415-64107-4.
- Kapczynski, Jennifer M.; Richardson, Michael D., eds. (2014) [2012]. A New History of German Cinema. Boydell & Brewer. ISBN 978-1-58046-854-1.
