= Number 17 (disambiguation) =

Number 17 may refer to:

- 17 (number)
- Number 17 (play), a 1925 play by Joseph Jefferson Farjeon
- Number 17 (novel), a 1926 novel by Farjeon, inspired by the play
- Number 17 (1928 film), a silent British-German film directed by Géza von Bolváry
- Number Seventeen, a 1932 British film directed by Alfred Hitchcock
- Number 17 (1949 film), a Swedish film directed by Gösta Stevens
