= Julia Neilson =

English actress (1868–1957)

- Nielson in Dorothy Vernon of Haddon Hall, 1907
- Born: 12 June 1868; St Pancras, London, England
- Died: 27 May 1957 (aged 88); Hampstead, London, England
- Occupation: Actress
- Spouse(s): Fred Terry (m. 1891; died 1933)
- Children: 2

Julia Emilie Neilson (12 June 1868 – 27 May 1957) was an English actress best known for her numerous performances as Lady Blakeney in The Scarlet Pimpernel, for her roles in many tragedies and historical romances, and for her portrayal of Rosalind in a long-running production of As You Like It.

After establishing her reputation in a series of plays by W. S. Gilbert in 1888, Neilson joined the company of Herbert Beerbohm Tree, where she remained for five years, meeting her future husband, Fred Terry (brother to actresses Kate, Ellen, Marion and Florence Terry and great uncle of John Gielgud). With Terry, she played in London and on tour for nearly three decades. She was the mother of the actress Phyllis Neilson-Terry and actor Dennis Neilson-Terry.

== Life and career ==
Neilson was born in London, the only child of Alexander Ritchie Neilson, a jeweller, and his wife, Emilie Davis, a member of a family of five Jewish sisters, many of whose offspring became actresses. Neilson's parents divorced shortly after her birth, and her father soon died, leaving her mother to struggle to support her child. Her mother much later married a solicitor, William Morris, the widower of the actress Florence Terry, elder sister of the actor Fred Terry, who had, by that time, married Neilson.

Neilson was an indifferent student. At the age of twelve, she was sent to a boarding school in Wiesbaden, Germany, where she learned to speak French and German and began to study music, discovering that she excelled at this. She returned to England to enter the Royal Academy of Music in 1884, at the age of fifteen, to study piano. She soon discovered that she had a talent as a singer, winning the Llewellyn Thomas Gold Medal (1885), the Westmoreland Scholarship (1886) and the Sainton Dolby Prize (1886). While at the Academy, in 1887, she sang at the St James's Hall and also played roles in amateur theatre.

=== Early stage career ===
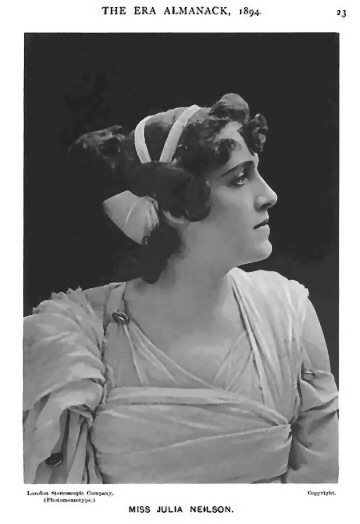
The Era Almanack, 1894

Neilson met the dramatist W. S. Gilbert, who cast her in her first professional stage appearance in March 1888. She played Cynisca in a charity matinée of his play, Pygmalion and Galatea, at the Lyceum Theatre, and later that year, in the same play, she was the lead character, Galatea, in a similar matinée at the Savoy Theatre. Gilbert suggested that the statuesque young woman concentrate her career on acting rather than singing, and he coached her on acting. Her next role was Lady Hilda in a revival of Gilbert's Broken Hearts. Gilbert wrote the lyrics to a short song for her to sing during Act I, and she proposed that a fellow student of hers at the Royal Academy, Edward German, should set it to music. She then played Selene in a revival of Gilbert's The Wicked World. In November 1888, she created the role of Ruth Redmayne in Rutland Barrington's production of Gilbert's Brantinghame Hall.

These roles led to an invitation for Neilson to join Herbert Beerbohm Tree's company, in which she toured in Captain Swift, The Red Lamp and The Merry Wives of Windsor. She remained with Tree's company for five years at the Haymarket Theatre as a tragedienne, beginning with the role of Julie de Noirville in A Man's Shadow, which opened in September 1889.

In 1891, Neilson married another actor in the company, Fred Terry, the brother of Gilbert's former protégée, Marion Terry (and the actresses Kate, Ellen and Florence Terry). Neilson and her husband appeared together in Sydney Grundy's translation of the French play A Village Priest and numerous other productions together with Tree's company, including Beau Austin, Hamlet, Peril and Gilbert's Comedy and Tragedy (1890). She also played Drusilla Ives in The Dancing Girl (1891) by Henry Arthur Jones, and Terry and Neilson's daughter Phyllis was born in 1892. Neilson was soon back on stage as Lady Isobel in Jones's The Tempter (1893), and created the role of Hester Worsley in Oscar Wilde's A Woman of No Importance (1893).

A review of Neilson's performance in the play Ballad Monger in 1890 declared:

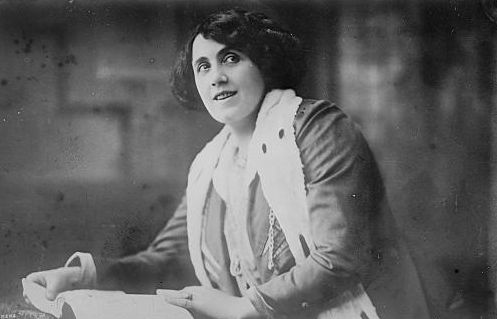
Postcard photo, 1890s

Miss Neilson's really wonderful singing took the curtain up on the very keynote of the beautiful and pathetic play. And to her singing no higher tribute can be paid. One of these days, we do not doubt, it will be possible to write in the same strain about her acting. In that there is splendid promise. And the promise will come the more near to performance when she is a trifle less conscious of her remarkable physical beauty, and of the fact that she has been to some extent rushed into her present position.

In June 1894, Neilson and Terry appeared together in Shall We Forgive Her? by Frank Harvey at the Adelphi Theatre, with Neilson as Grace. The next year, she played Lady Chiltern in Wilde's comedy An Ideal Husband at the Haymarket under the management of Lewis Waller. She gave birth to her second child, Dennis, in October 1895. Two months later, the family travelled to America to perform with John Hare's company. There they played together in New York in The Notorious Mrs. Ebbsmith by Arthur Wing Pinero, with Neilson as Agnes.

In 1896, they returned to England where, at the St James's Theatre, Neilson played Princess Flavia in The Prisoner of Zenda by Anthony Hope, remaining at that theatre for two years. There she played Rosalind in the extremely successful run of As You Like It (in which role she toured North America in 1895 and 1910). She played the title role in Pinero's The Princess and the Butterfly in 1897.

Her husband appeared with her in The Tree of Knowledge and other plays from October 1897 until the summer of 1898; her roles included Beatrice in Much Ado About Nothing. Next, they appeared in The Gipsy Earl. Again with Tree's company, now at Her Majesty's Theatre, Neilson was Constance in King John (1899) (and appeared in an early short silent movie recreating King John's death scene at the end of the play) and Oberon in A Midsummer Night's Dream (1900). They then toured in As You Like It.

Neilson and Fred Terry in Henry of Navarre, 1909

=== Later years ===
The couple entered into management together in 1900, producing and starring in Sweet Nell of Old Drury by Paul Kester. They would continue to produce plays together for the next 30 years, most notably, The Scarlet Pimpernel (1905 at the New Theatre), which they also starred in and, with J. M. Barstow, adapted for the stage from Baroness Orczy's manuscript. Despite scathing reviews from the critics, the play was a record-breaking hit and played for more than 2,000 performances, then enjoying numerous revivals.

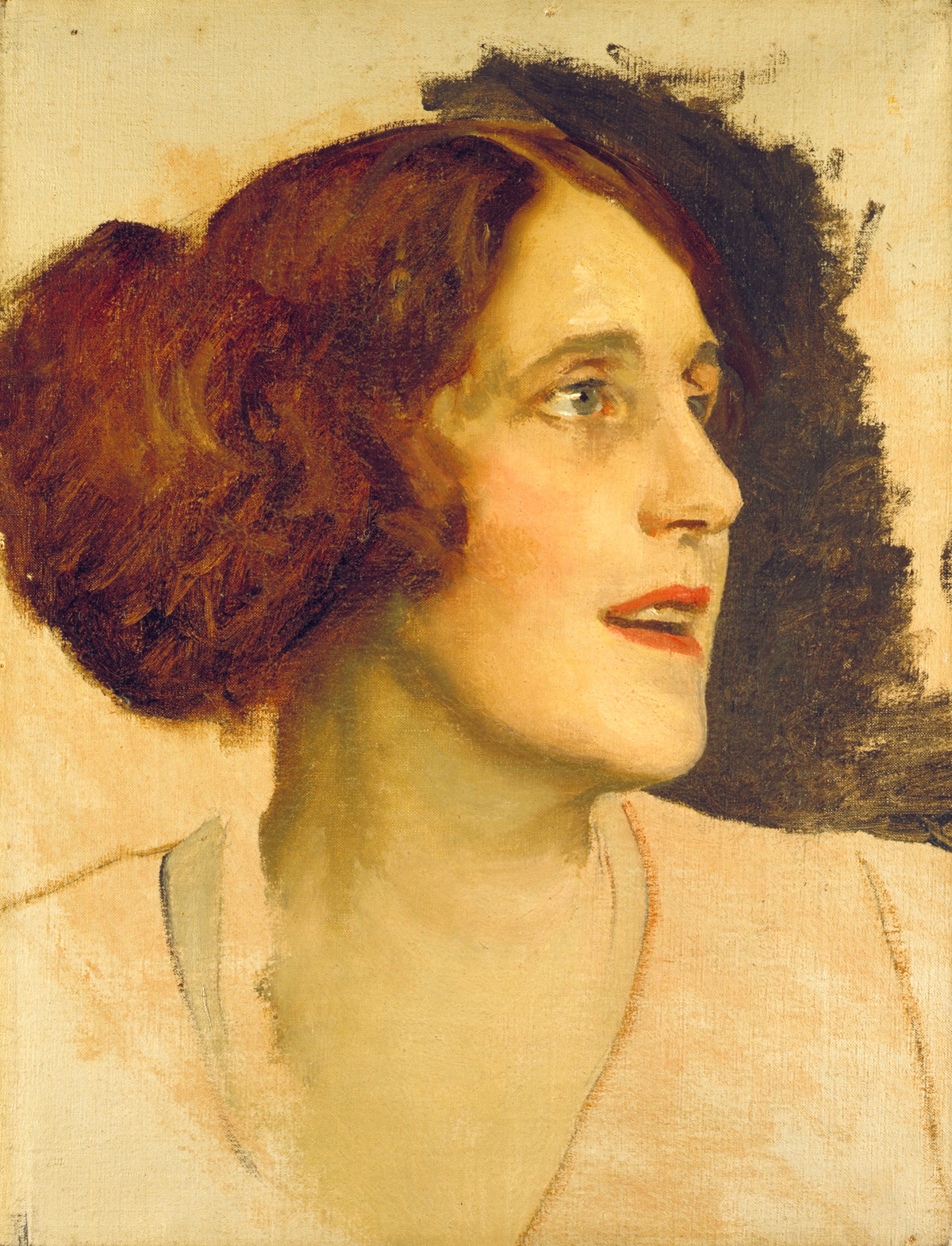
Neilson, c. 1920, by R. G. Eves

Neilson's roles also included the title role in Kester's adaptation of Dorothy Vernon of Haddon Hall (1907). Neilson's and Terry's productions continued to favour historical romances or comedy melodramas, including Henry of Navarre by William Devereux (1909 at the New Theatre). Henry and Sweet Nell became their signature pieces during many tours of the British provinces and during their US tour in 1910. They also produced and starred with much success in For Sword or Song by Robert Legge and Louis Calvert (1903), Dorothy o' the Hall by Paul Kester and Charles Major (1906), The Popinjay by Boyle Lawrence and Frederick Mouillot (1911), Mistress Wilful by Ernest Hendrie (1915), The Borderer (1921), The Marlboroughs (1924), and The Wooing of Katherine Parr by William Devereux (1926). They also starred in A Wreath of a Hundred Roses (1922), which was a masque by Louis N. Parker at the Duke's Hall to celebrate the Royal Academy's centenary. In 1926, Neilson starred alongside Lawrence Grossmith in a revival of Henry of Navarre, which toured the provinces. She later starred in This Thing Called Love in 1929.

Her son Dennis died of pneumonia in 1932, and her husband, Fred Terry, died in 1933. Neilson retired from the stage after a run as Josephine Popinot in the revival of the farce Vintage Wine by Seymour Hicks and Ashley Dukes at Daly's Theatre. In 1938, she was given a testimonial luncheon to mark her fiftieth anniversary as a performer. Neilson made a brief return to the stage in 1944 to play Lady Rutven in The Widow of 40 by Heron Carvic. She wrote a memoir entitled, This For Remembrance, which gives an account of her life in the theatre business. Her children with Terry, Phyllis and Dennis, were both actors. Her first cousin was the actress Hilda Hanbury, whose descendants became the Fox acting dynasty.

Neilson died in a hospital in Hampstead, London, after a fall at her home, in 1957 at the age of 88. She was cremated at Golders Green, and she and her husband are both buried at Hampstead Cemetery in London.

== See also ==
- Terry family
- Neilson–Terry Guild of Dramatic Art
