= The Black Abbot =

The Black Abbot may refer to

- The Black Abbot (book), a 1926 crime novel by Edgar Wallace
- The Black Abbot (1934 film), an unrelated British film starring Richard Cooper
- The Black Abbot (1963 film), a German crime film based on the novel
