= Fred Terry =

English actor (1863–1933)

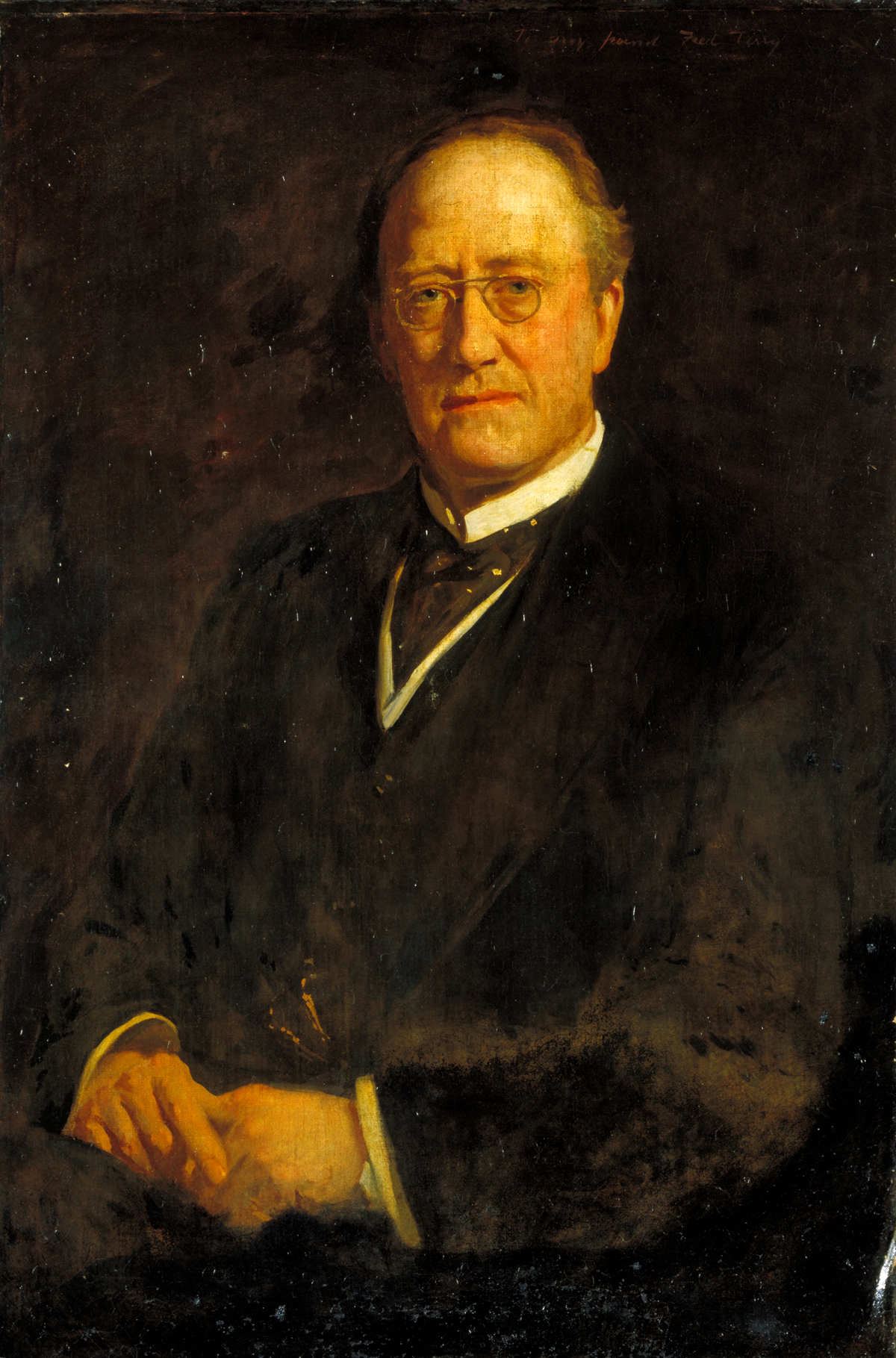
Terry, c. 1920, by R. G. Eves

Fred Terry (9 November 1863 – 17 April 1933) was an English actor and theatrical manager. After establishing his reputation in London and in the provinces for a decade, he joined the company of Sir Herbert Beerbohm Tree where he remained for four years, meeting his future wife, Julia Neilson. With Neilson, he played in London and on tour for 27 further years, becoming famous in sword-and-cape roles, such as the title role in The Scarlet Pimpernel.

== Biography ==
Terry was born in London into a theatrical family. His parents, Benjamin (1817–1896) of Irish descent, and Sarah (née Ballard) (1819–1892), of Scottish ancestry, were comic actors in a touring company based in Portsmouth, where Sarah's father was a Wesleyan minister, and had eleven children of which Fred was the youngest son. At least five of these became actors: Kate, Ellen, Marion, Florence and Fred. Two other children, George and Charles, were connected with theatre management.

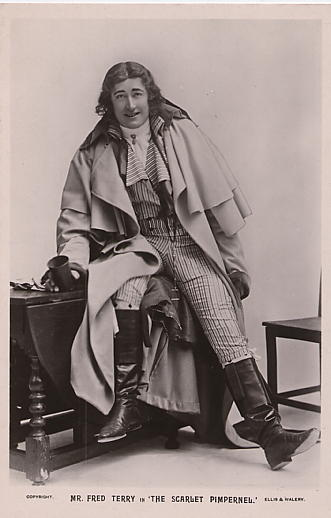
Terry as the Scarlet Pimpernel, in The Scarlet Pimpernel, 1905

Terry's sister Kate was a very successful actress until her marriage and retirement from the stage in 1867, and his sister Ellen became the greatest Shakespearean actress of her time. His great-nephew (Kate's grandson), John Gielgud, became one of the twentieth century's most respected actors. Terry was educated in London, France and Switzerland.

During his career, Terry toured extensively, playing in all the principal cities of the United Kingdom and North America. His first stage appearance was at the Haymarket Theatre in 1880 at the age of 16, in a revival of Bulwer-Lytton's Money, with the Bancrofts. After appearances on tour, he was engaged at the Lyceum Theatre in 1884 in Henry Irving's production of Twelfth Night, as Sebastian to the Viola of his sister Ellen. In her memoirs, his sister Ellen wrote, "I don't think that I have ever seen any success so unmistakable and instantaneous." He then returned to touring, in Britain and the US. Back in London by July 1887, he appeared in Nina at The Strand. He had a success at the Avenue Theatre, as Dr William Brown in Dr Bill, by Hamilton Aidé, in 1890. He joined the company of Herbert Beerbohm Tree at the Haymarket Theatre, appearing in numerous productions with the company from 1890 to 1894. His roles there included D'Aulnay in W. S. Gilbert's Comedy and Tragedy (1890) and John Christison in Henry Arthur Jones's The Dancing Girl (1891). In the cast of this last, he met Julia Neilson, daughter of Alexander Ritchie Neilson, whom he married later that year. For Tree, he also played Laertes in Hamlet and appeared in Sydney Grundy's translation of the French play A Village Priest, Beau Austin and Peril. Terry and Neilson's daughter Phyllis was born in 1892.

In 1894, Terry and Neilson appeared together in Shall We Forgive Her? by Frank Harvey at the Adelphi Theatre. Their second child, Dennis, was born in October 1895. Two months later, the family travelled to America to perform with John Hare's company. There they played together in New York in The Notorious Mrs. Ebbsmith by Arthur Wing Pinero. In 1896, they returned to England, where he played at the Lyceum as Charles Surface in a revival of Sheridan's The School for Scandal with Johnston Forbes-Robertson. Terry and his wife appeared together in The Tree of Knowledge and other plays from October 1897 until the summer of 1898, including Much Ado About Nothing at the St James's Theatre, in which he played Don Pedro. Next, they appeared in The Gipsy Earl. He was Squire Thornhill in William Gorman Wills's Olivia at the Lyceum in 1900. They then toured in As You Like It.

== Later years ==
Julia Neilson and Terry in Henry of Navarre, 1909

For the next 27 years, Terry and Neilson played together, mainly in popular romantic historical dramas, with Terry in swashbuckling roles. At the Haymarket, he was particularly known for his role of King Charles II in the play Sweet Nell of Old Drury by Paul Kester, which became one of his signature roles. They toured extensively in the British provinces, but they had annual six-month London seasons at the New Theatre from 1905 to 1913. During these they premiered several new plays in London, including Baroness Orczy's The Scarlet Pimpernel, which they adapted for the stage with J. M. Barstow (1905), with Terry creating his other signature part of Sir Percy Blakeney. Despite scathing reviews from the critics, the play was a record-breaking hit and played for more than 2000 performances, then enjoying numerous revivals.

Terry and Neilson also introduced and starred with much success in For Sword or Song by Robert Legge and Louis Calvert (1903), Dorothy o' the Hall by Paul Kester and Charles Major (1906), and Henry of Navarre (1909) by William Devereux. Henry and Sweet Nell became their signature pieces during many tours of the British provinces and during their US tour in 1910. They also produced The Popinjay by Boyle Lawrence, Frederick Mouillot (1911), and Mistress Wilful by Ernest Hendrie (1915). In 1915, Terry and Neilson took over the management of the Strand Theatre, reviving and starring in Sweet Nell of Old Drury. Their later productions included The Borderer (1921), The Marlboroughs (1924), and The Wooing of Katherine Parr by William Devereux (1926). They also starred in A Wreath of a Hundred Roses (1922), which was a masque by Louis N. Parker at the Duke's Hall to celebrate the Royal Academy's centenary. Terry was also well known on tour for his Benedick in Much Ado and his Charles Surface.

The couple's son Dennis became an actor, whose career was cut short by his death in 1932, and their daughter Phyllis Neilson-Terry became a noted actress. In 1918, a group of British theatre managers from 60 of the theatres that he had played in presented to Terry a portrait, painted by Frank Daniell, of Terry as Sir Percy Blakeney. Terry retired from the stage in 1927. A Freemason, he joined the Green Room Lodge No. 2957 on 6 May 1904, an actors' lodge which included Leedham Bantock, George Grossmith Jr. and Gerald du Maurier among its members.

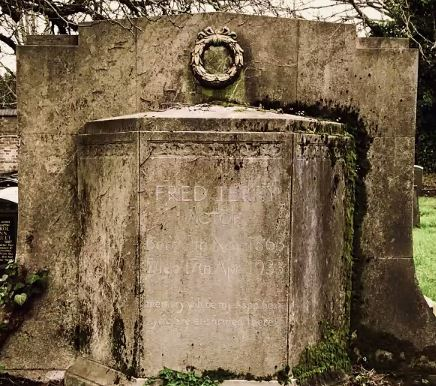
Grave of Fred and Julia Terry in Hampstead Cemetery

He died at his home in St Pancras, London, in 1933 at the age of 69. He, together with his wife and son Dennis, are buried in Hampstead Cemetery.

== See also ==
- Terry family
- Neilson-Terry Guild of Dramatic Art
