= Araminta Arrives =

1921 play

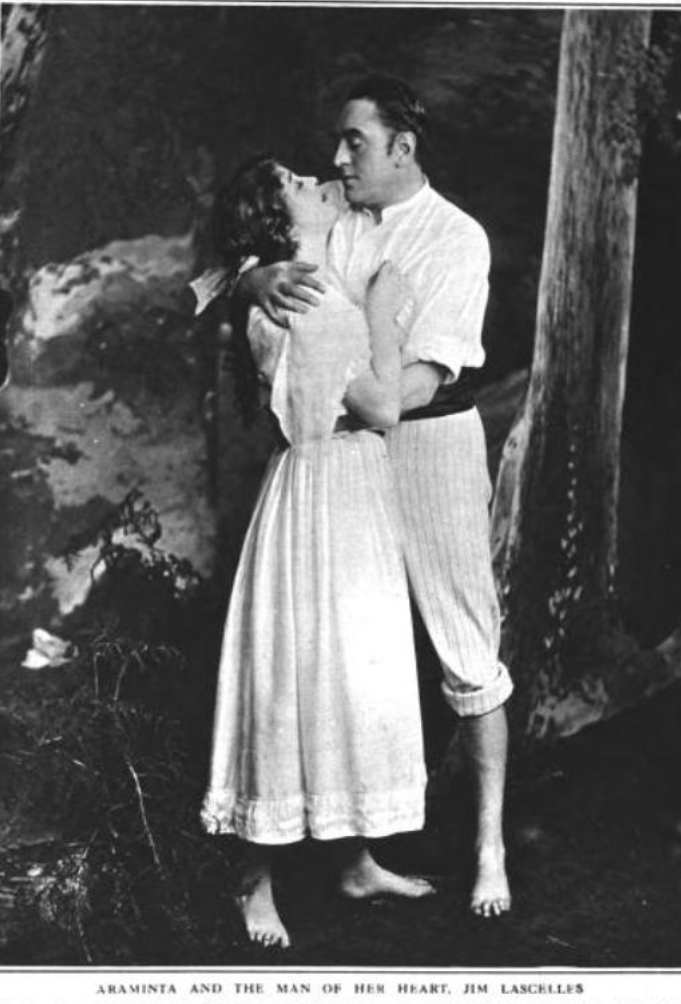
- A scene from Araminta Arrives
- Written by: Dorothy Brandon
- Based on: "Araminta" by John Snaith
- Original language: English
- Genre: Romantic comedy
- Setting: London, 1887

Premiere
- Date premiered: 3 October 1921
- Place premiered: Winter Gardens Theatre, New Brighton

Araminta Arrives is a 1921 play by the British writer Dorothy Brandon. It is an historical romantic comedy, set in 1887, about a young woman going to live with her aunt in London and becoming involved in a series of entanglements with men. The play was adapted from J.C. Snaith's 1908 novel, Araminta.

It premiered at the Winter Gardens Theatre in New Brighton before transferring for a West End run at the Comedy Theatre that lasted for 39 performances. The cast included Eileen Beldon in the title role, along with Herbert Bunston, Louise Hampton and Lady Tree.

== Reception ==
Araminta Arrives opened to mixed reviews. Several critics found the titular character's naivety dull or irritating.

Punch gave the play a mixed review, but praised the cast's acting.
