= Neilson–Terry Guild of Dramatic Art =

Coordinates: 51°31′0″N 0°8′46″W

The Neilson–Terry Guild of Dramatic Art was a drama school at 17 Cavendish Square in London. In the 1930s it was run by the actress and playwright, Louise Regnis. Students included playwright Elizabeth FitzRoy, Kirsten Forssmann, Mary Joan (Mollie) Hammond, and Marjorie Johnstone. During World War II most of the school went to Bath, and the company was finally shut down in 1948.

== See also ==
- Julia Neilson
- Fred Terry
- Phyllis Neilson-Terry
- Terry family
