= The House Opposite (novel) =

1931 novel

- Author: Joseph Jefferson Farjeon
- Language: English
- Series: Detective Ben
- Genre: Mystery
- Publisher: Collins Crime Club
- Publication date: 1931
- Publication place: United Kingdom
- Media type: Print
- Preceded by: Number 17
- Followed by: Murderer's Trail

The House Opposite is a 1931 mystery crime novel by the British writer Joseph Jefferson Farjeon. It was the second in his series of novels featuring Detective Ben, following the 1926 novel Number 17. It was published by the Collins Crime Club which had been established the previous year.

== Film adaptation ==
It was made into a 1932 British film of the same title directed by Walter Summers and starring Henry Kendall and Frank Stanmore. It was produced by British International Pictures who also released Number Seventeen a version of the first novel in the series, directed by Alfred Hitchcock.

== Bibliography ==
- Goble, Alan. The Complete Index to Literary Sources in Film. Walter de Gruyter, 1999.
- Hubin, Allen J. Crime Fiction, 1749-1980: A Comprehensive Bibliography. Garland Publishing, 1984.
