= The Terror (play) =

1927 play

- Original language: English
- Written by: Edgar Wallace
- Genre: Mystery

Premiere
- Date: 21 February 1927
- Place: Winter Gardens Theatre, New Brighton; Lyceum Theatre, London

The Terror is a 1927 mystery thriller play by the British writer Edgar Wallace. It is based on Wallace's 1926 novel The Black Abbot.

It premiered at the Winter Gardens Theatre in New Brighton, before beginning a run of 246 performances at the Lyceum Theatre in the West End. The original cast included John Turnbull, Felix Aylmer, Franklyn Bellamy, Dennis Neilson-Terry, Carol Reed and Mary Glynne.

== Film adaptations ==
In 1928 it was turned into an early sound film The Terror by the American studio Warner Bros. This was followed in 1934 Return of the Terror, which was neither a sequel nor a remake but was loosely-inspired by the original play.

In 1938 the play was adapted into a British film The Terror starring Wilfrid Lawson, Linden Travers and Bernard Lee, shot at Elstree Studios.

== Bibliography ==
- Goble, Alan. The Complete Index to Literary Sources in Film. Walter de Gruyter, 1999.
- Kabatchnik, Amnon. Blood on the Stage, 1975-2000: Milestone Plays of Crime, Mystery, and Detection : an Annotated Repertoire. Rowman & Littlefield, 2012.
- Wearing, J. P. The London Stage 1920-1929: A Calendar of Productions, Performers, and Personnel. Rowman & Littlefield, 2014.
