= Desire (1920 film) =

1920 British film by George Edwardes-Hall

- Directed by: George Edwardes-Hall
- Written by: George Edwardes-Hall; Honoré de Balzac (novel)
- Produced by: Edward Godal
- Starring: Dennis Neilson-Terry; Yvonne Arnaud; Christine Maitland
- Production company: British and Colonial
- Distributed by: Butcher's Film Service
- Release date: January 1920
- Running time: 54 minutes
- Country: United Kingdom
- Languages: Silent; English intertitles

Desire (aka The Magic Skin) is a 1920 British silent fantasy film directed by George Edwardes-Hall, produced by Edward Godal, and starring Dennis Neilson-Terry, Yvonne Arnaud and Christine Maitland. The film was known in England as The Magic Skin. The screenplay was based on the 1831 Honoré de Balzac novel Le Peau de Chagrin, which strangely was adapted to film three different times in 1920 alone, the other two being released as The Dream Cheater and Narayama.

Born in 1872, director Hall relocated from his birthplace Brooklyn, New York to England later in life, then moved to California, where he died in 1922. He actually did more screenwriting than directing during his career, and also wrote a number of plays and short stories.

== Plot ==
A man named Valentin obtains a magic shagreen, a leather hide made from the skin of a wild jackass. The shagreen is said to grant its owner's every wish, but at the price of his immortal soul.

== Cast ==
- Dennis Neilson-Terry as Raphael Valentin
- Yvonne Arnaud as Pauline
- Christine Maitland as Fedora
- George W. Anson as Duval
- Chris Walker as Jonathan
- Pardoe Woodman as Emile
- Austin Leigh as Andre Valentin
- Saba Raleigh as Mother

== Bibliography ==
- Low, Rachael. History of the British Film, 1918-1929. George Allen & Unwin, 1971.
