= Phyllis Neilson-Terry =

English actress (1892–1977)

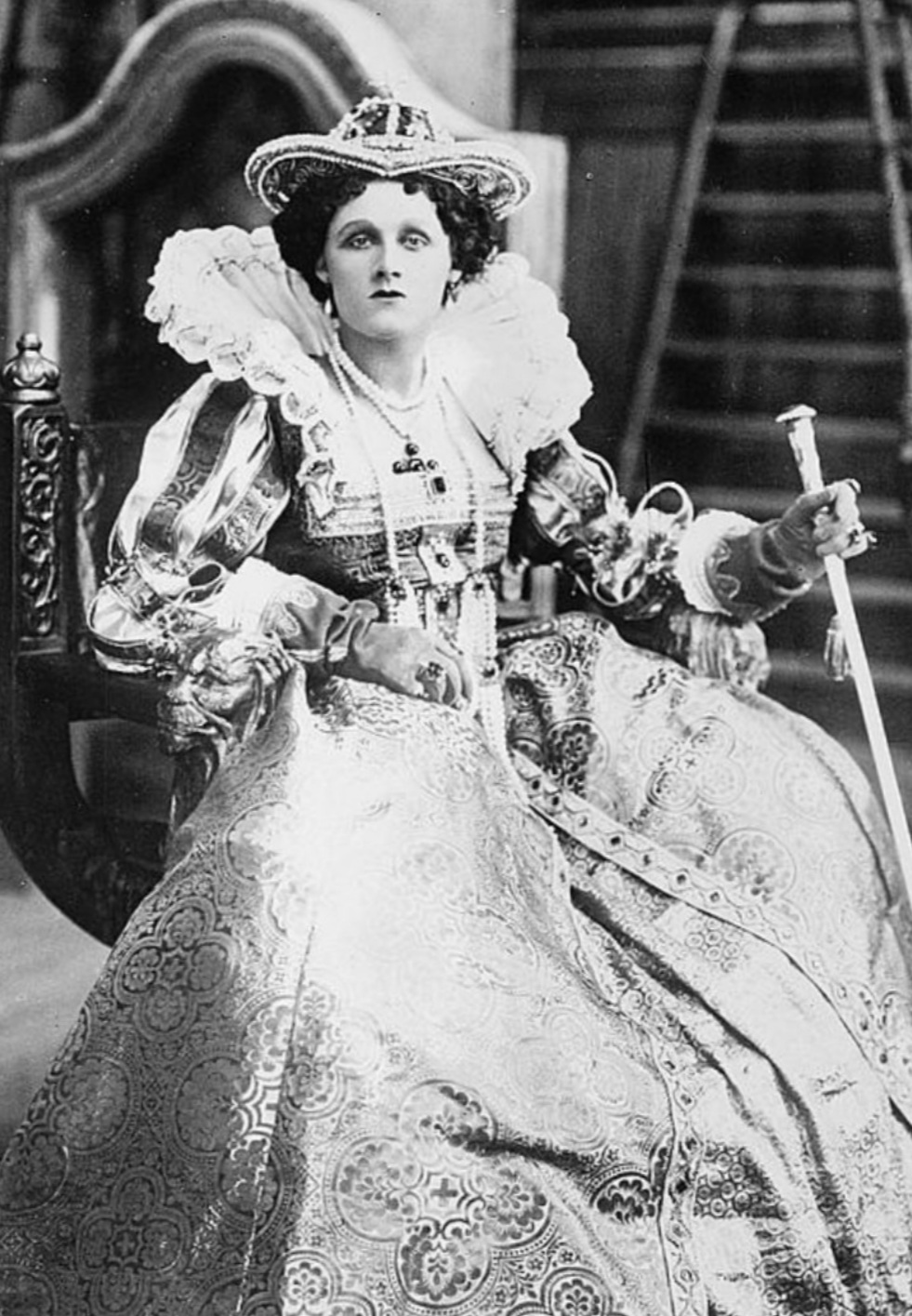
- Neilson-Terry in 1910
- Born: 15 October 1892; London, England
- Died: 25 September 1977 (aged 84); London, England
- Other name: Phillida Terson
- Occupation: Actress
- Years active: 1909–1960
- Spouses: Cecil King (m. 1916; died 1958); Heron Carvic (m. 1958)
- Parents: Fred Terry (father); Julia Neilson (mother)
- Relatives: See Terry family

Phyllis Neilson-Terry (15 October 1892 – 25 September 1977) was an English actress. She was a member of the third generation of the theatrical dynasty the Terry family. After early successes in the classics, including several leading Shakespearean roles, she spent more than four years in the US, in generally lightweight presentations.

Returning to England in 1919 she pursued a varied career, including cabaret, pantomime and variety as well as returning to Shakespeare and other classics. One of her last major roles was in Terence Rattigan's Separate Tables (1954) in which she played in the West End and on Broadway.

== Biography ==
=== Early years ===
Neilson-Terry was born in London, the daughter of the actress Julia Neilson and her husband, the actor Fred Terry. The couple's other child was Phyllis's younger brother, Dennis, who also went on the stage. She was educated first at Westgate-on-Sea, and then in Paris, and after that at the Royal Academy of Music in London, where she studied to be a singer.

In 1909, Neilson-Terry made her first stage appearance, in her parents' stage company on tour in Blackpool; she played Marie de Belleforêt in Henry of Navarre, under the stage name Phillida Terson. The attempt to disguise her membership of the Terry dynasty was unsuccessful and the following year she abandoned it and reverted to her own name.

Her London debut was in the same role, at the New Theatre in January 1910. The following month, when her mother was unwell, she took over the leading role of Marguerite de Valois. The drama critic of The Observer commented that her performance in such a heavy role "must be pronounced very promising indeed".

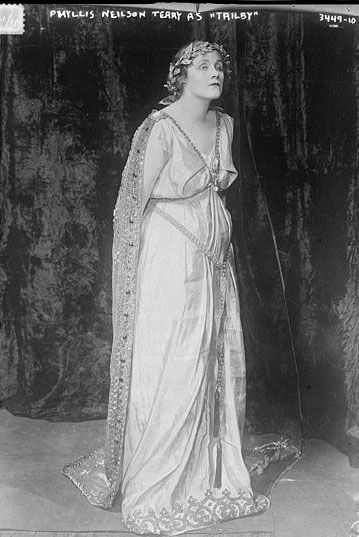
Neilson-Terry as Trilby

In April 1910, she played Viola in Twelfth Night in Sir Herbert Tree's company at His Majesty's in a cast that included Tree as Malvolio and her father as Viola's twin brother, Sebastian, a role he had formerly played to the Viola of his sister, Ellen. Her reviews were enthusiastic; The Observer said that expectations were extremely high but "she proved able to justify all, and more than all, the expectations which her effort had aroused", and The Times said that she "won everybody's heart from the first moment of her appearance. Tree, in a post-curtain speech, predicted that she would "add fresh honors to the honored name of Terry for many a long year".

From 1910 to 1914, Neilson-Terry played a wide range of parts; in the classics her roles included Rosalind in As You Like It (1911), Juliet in Romeo and Juliet, Desdemona in Othello and Portia in The Merchant of Venice (all 1912). She also appeared in modern plays, including a revival of Trilby opposite Tree's Svengali. She continued to play the role in revivals in many parts of the world in later years.

In 1914, she went to the United States, and, having signed a long-term contract, did not return to Britain until 1919. In America she reprised her Trilby, appeared in vaudeville giving songs, recitations and excerpts from Shakespeare, performed at Yale University, and played Nora Marsh in Somerset Maugham's The Land of Promise. She toured with the company, appearing in the play Maggie which played at the Princess Theatre in Toronto, Canada in 1918.

=== Later career ===
Neilson-Terry in 1922

In the Dictionary of National Biography J. C. Trewin wrote that it was "unfortunate" that Fred Terry seldom extended himself by taking the great classic roles for which his talent fitted him. The Times's obituarist of Terry's daughter made a similar point about her, commenting that after returning from the US she did not regain the outstanding position she had won for herself as a young actress. As in America, she toured with light variety programs, and in ephemeral crowd-pleasing plays. Among the latter was The Wheel by J B Fagan, in which she gave her young cousin John Gielgud his first paid acting role, in 1922.

During the 1920s, Neilson-Terry toured in South Africa, and appeared in Britain in a range of performance from cabaret to pantomime at Drury Lane. She played in Shakespeare at the Open Air Theatre, Regent's Park and on tour with Donald Wolfit. In the 1930s she played Lady Macbeth and Queen Katherine in Henry VIII at the Shakespeare Memorial Theatre, Stratford-upon-Avon. In Gielgud's view, her most notable role of the inter-war years was Queen Elizabeth in Ferdinand Bruckner's Elizabeth of England: "In this play she showed unexpected tragic power in the scene in which Essex bursts into her presence to find her wigless and disheveled".

During the 1940s her roles included Miss Moffat in The Corn is Green in which Gielgud said she acted "with undiminished grace". In the 1950s her most notable role was Mrs. Railton-Bell, the tyrannical matriarch in Rattigan's Separate Tables. She later played the role on Broadway. Her final stage performances were as Lady Bletchley in Frederick Lonsdale's Let Them Eat Cake (1959) and Lady Godolphin in Robert Kemp's Off a Duck's Back (1960).

== Personal life ==
Neilson-Terry was twice married. Both her husbands were actors: Cecil King and Heron Carvic. She died in London at the age of 84.

== Filmography ==
- Trilby; (1915 Hollywood version, directed by Maurice Tourneur; not the 1914 British version starring Tree).
- The Call of the Blood (1921, Western film) as Hermione Lester
- Tense Moments with Great Authors (1922, Short) as Trilby
- Boadicea (1927) as Queen Boadicea
- One Family (1930, British Empire film) as 'Australia'
- Rx Murder (1958) as Lady Lacy
- The Enchanted April (1958, ITV Play of the Week) as Mrs Fisher
- Ivanhoe (1958, TV Series) as Queen Eleanor
- Pride and Prejudice (1958, TV series) as Lady Catherine de Bourgh
- Look Back in Anger (1959) as Mrs. Redfern
- Conspiracy of Hearts (1960) as Sister Elizaveta (final film role)

== See also ==
- Terry family
- Neilson-Terry Guild of Dramatic Art
