= Her Greatest Performance =

1916 British film by Fred Paul

- Directed by: Fred Paul
- Written by: Benedict James; Enid Lorimer
- Produced by: Fred Paul; Maurice Elvey
- Starring: Edith Craig; Ellen Terry; Dennis Neilson-Terry; Joan Morgan
- Production company: Ideal Film Company
- Distributed by: Ideal Film Company
- Release date: 25 August 1916 (UK)
- Running time: 92 minutes
- Country: United Kingdom
- Language: English

Her Greatest Performance is a 1916 British silent crime film directed by Fred Paul and starring Edith Craig, Ellen Terry and Dennis Neilson-Terry.

Gerald Lovelace (Dennis Neilson-Terry) is accused of a crime and wrongly arrested, his mother (Ellen Terry) gives 'her greatest performance' when providing him with an alibi. Joan Morgan plays his daughter.

Presumably this is a lost film.

== Main cast ==
- Edith Craig - The Dresser
- Ellen Terry - Julia Lovelace
- Dennis Neilson-Terry - Gerald Lovelace
- Joan Morgan - Barbara Lovelace
- James Lindsay - Jim Douglas
- Gladys Mason - Mary Scott
