= Brantinghame Hall =

Play by W. S. Gilbert

Programme cover

Brantinghame Hall is a play in four acts written by W. S. Gilbert for his friend Rutland Barrington, who was then leasing the St. James's Theatre. The play opened on 29 November 1888 and closed on 29 December, after about 27 performances. It starred Barrington, his younger brother, Duncan Fleet, Lewis Waller, and Julia Neilson (being the professional stage debut of the latter two). Its companion piece was A Patron Saint.

Brantinghame Hall was the worst financial failure of Gilbert's career and sent Barrington into bankruptcy. Gilbert vowed never to write another serious drama again, although eventually he did. Historian Jane Stedman speculates that the failure of this play (produced soon after The Yeomen of the Guard, which increased Arthur Sullivan's desire to turn to more serious operas), and Gilbert's subsequent aversion at this time to writing serious drama, may have hurt Gilbert's partnership with Sullivan, since Gilbert declined to write any more serious librettos for Sullivan. However, this conclusion is dubious, since Gilbert and Sullivan soon collaborated on the comic and lively (and very successful) The Gondoliers (1889). Moreover, though Gilbert declined to write the libretto to Sullivan's grand opera, Ivanhoe (1891), it was he who recommended Julian Sturgis, who wrote the libretto for Sullivan.

Many of the characters in the play are reminiscent of those in Gilbert's Savoy Operas, including Somers/Boatswain; Ross/Dr. Daly; Ruth/Patience and Elsie; Alaric/Giuseppe; Mabel/Aline; and Thursby/Ludwig. Also, as in some of his earlier plays, including Charity, Gilbert touches on the theme of how a shamed woman is truly the noblest in society. The character Ruth notes, regarding the scoundrel, Crampton, "your heart was slow to turn; your eyes were closed. To open them it needed that a woman should clothe herself with shame. That has been done; and now, you see!" And she is told by Mr. Thursby, "the sooner a ship-load of you is shot into London society the better!" (Act IV)

== Roles and cast ==
- Lord Saxmundham, of Brantinghame Hall – Nutcombe Gould
- Hon. Arthur Redmayne, travelling in Australia: his elder son – W. Herbert
- Hon. Alaric Redmayne, at Eton: His son – Duncan Fleet
- Mr. Thursby, a wealthy country gentleman – Rutland Barrington
- Ralph Crampton, travelling with Arthur Redmayne – Lewis Waller
- Rev. Noel Ross, a bush missionary – Norman Forbes
- Mr. Parfit, Saxmundham's solicitor – Gilbert Trent
- Mr. Paulby, a Sydney solicitor – Mr. Newall
- Dick Somers, leader of the Australian stockmen – C. Dodsworth
- Smithers, Australian stockman – Mr. Montagu
- Blueby, Australian stockman – F. Lacy
- Baker, Australian stockman – Nicol Pentland
- Parker, Mr. Thursby's butler – Mr. Warden
- Lady Saxmundham – Mrs. Gaston Murray
- Ruth, young wife of Arthur Redmayne, daughter of ex-convict Stephen Brunt – Julia Neilson
- Mabel, Thursby's daughter – Rose Norreys

== Synopsis ==
Act I

At Brunt's Station, New South Wales, a group of Australian stockmen and cowboys wait to speak to Arthur Redmayne about his recent marriage to young Ruth. Ruth (the daughter of an ex-convict) had nursed Arthur to health from near death when he first arrived in the village, and the two fell in love. The stockmen like Ruth and want to make sure that Arthur treats her well. Arthur tells them and then Ruth that he doesn't plan to give the news of his marriage to his father until he and Ruth travel to England to tell the old Lord in person. Meanwhile, the Rev Noel Ross, who performed Ruth and Arthur's wedding ceremony, reveals that he has come to Brunt's Station to avoid the temptations of the city, for his flesh is susceptible.

Crampton (a creditor of Lord Saxmundham's) and Paulby arrive. Crampton declares his love for Ruth (having brought the dying Arthur to her), and Arthur aims a savage diatribe at Crampton, finally pointing out that Ruth is Arthur's wife. Crampton curses Arthur for this ill-treatment, stating that he has made a lifelong enemy. Meanwhile, Paulby has brought news that Arthur's godfather, Sir James Crawshay, has died in England and has left Arthur a fortune of three hundred thousand pounds – enough to make them rich and to extract his father from his debts. Arthur is a trustee under the will and must return to England at once to sort out affairs. But Ruth feels that she cannot leave her sick old father, and Arthur agrees to go alone, with Ruth to follow at her first opportunity. Arthur leaves Noel Ross with his own will, made in Ruth's favour, and leaves in haste.

Act II

Eighteen months later, we learn that a bottle washed ashore near Point de Galle, Sri Lanka, containing a slip of paper indicating that Arthur's ship had sunk. Lord Saxmundham, as heir-at-law to his son, is therefore entitled to the estate demised to Arthur by his godfather. In Brantinghame Hall, Lord S., still in desperate financial straits, waits to hear whether a judge has ordered the estate to be turned over to him. Alaric Redmayne (in his last year at Eton) and Mabel tell Lady Saxmundham that they wish to marry, but Lady S. says that they are too young and asks them to postpone any discussion of marriage for "a long time." Alaric makes a comically poor attempt to explain to Mabel why Radicals (him) are much better than Tories (Mr. Thursby), and Mabel finds his tortured logic very statesmanlike.

Thursby brings the good news that the estate has been settled. Crampton arrives, threatening to foreclose on Brantinghame Hall, but Lord S. states that his debt shall be paid within the week. The grieving Ruth (her ex-convict father has died) shows up and points out that she is Arthur's widow and she has come to meet her beloved husband's family and to offer them her love. Lord S. blurts out that he is "amazed and distressed." When he sees the marriage certificate and will, Lord S. notes that the fortune now belongs to Ruth. Ruth offers it to Lord S., but he declines sadly, saying "You speak kindly and generously; but you do not understand these matters." He sends her to his solicitor and asks to be alone as he bursts into tears.

Act III

Two weeks later, in Brantingame Hall, Mr. Parfit readies the deed to surrender the Hall to Crampton. He urges Lord Saxmundham to borrow money from his friends to try to hang on to the Hall, in which nine generations of Saxmundhams have lived and died. Lord S. sadly declines, saying that this would only be postponing the inevitable. Lord S. points out to Alaric that they are now penniless, and that the lad must not marry Mabel, to avoid any accusation that he is a "fortune hunter." Instead, he must go to India to "make his own way." He breaks the news to Mabel and they part.

Crampton tells Parfit, as they arrive at the Hall, that he is disposed to suspend the foreclosure, and Parfit goes to fetch the old Lord. Ruth enters and tries to avoid Crampton. He again declares that he loves her and tries to explain that his ex-wife had left him wrongfully. Ruth rejects him, and Crampton says angrily that in retaliation, he will go ahead to ruin Lord S. Ruth eloquently explains that this would be a cowardly act and suggests that perhaps Crampton is not a coward, and she leaves. Parfit returns with Lord S., and Crampton says that he wishes to go ahead with the foreclosure. Ruth returns with Thursby, and they implore Lord S. to permit Ruth to help him. He declines again, and Ralph suggests that he will stay the execution of the foreclosure if Ruth will "give me the love for which I have so long waited." Ruth then declares, to everyone's astonishment, that she has lied: she was not Arthur's wife after all. She rushes from the room, and Crampton is left in distress.

Act IV

Later that day, in Thursby's morning room, Ruth and Thursby acknowledge that she must leave at once. Ruth tells Mabel that Alaric is wealthy again, and so she may get back together with him. Ruth also tells Mabel that she must go, and that if Mabel hears ill of her, "to believe that there is something kept back – something which, if it were known, would clear me of all blame." Ruth leaves. Crampton arrives and, moved by Ruth's selfless act, confesses to Thursby and Parfit that he knows Ruth was truly married to Arthur. Ruth returns, confirms this, and tells Crampton that she forgives him.

Everyone leaves Ruth alone, when the missionary, Noel Ross arrives unexpectedly. He tells Ruth of his difficult voyage from Australia and notes that one must not give up hope when there is even the tiniest hope left, even if one were shipwrecked and "counted as dead...." Ruth is upset at his imagery, but then she grows suspicious. Arthur bursts into the room very much alive. Ruth kneels, saying, "Let us pray."*

== Criticism ==
In general, the critics felt that the play reflected Gilbert's 1860s style more than his more mature playwriting. The closing line, "Let us pray", added by Gilbert late in the play's construction, was widely believed to ruin the final scene and cause hilarity where drama was needed. Gilbert soon cut the line, but it was too late, and the play folded. Clement Scott's harsh review (especially of Neilson) led to the termination of Gilbert's relationship with Scott and threats of legal action. According to Barrington's 1908 memoir, the critics also felt that no woman would go to the lengths that the heroine does in the play to save her husband's father.
