= Number 17 (novel) =

1926 novel by Joseph Jefferson Farjeon

No. 17
- 1939 edition by Penguin Books
- Author: Joseph Jefferson Farjeon
- Language: English
- Series: Detective Ben
- Genre: Thriller
- Publisher: Hodder and Stoughton
- Publication date: 1926
- Publication place: United Kingdom
- Media type: Print
- Followed by: The House Opposite

No. 17 is a 1926 thriller novel by the British writer Joseph Jefferson Farjeon, inspired by his successful play of the same title from the previous year. Along with the play it provided inspiration for Alfred Hitchcock's 1932 film Number Seventeen.

It is the first of a series of stories featuring the character of Ben, a former merchant sailor now down on his luck, who continually gets involved in adventures.

== Bibliography ==
- Maurice Yacowar. Hitchcock's British Films. Wayne State University Press, 2010.
