= The Terror (1928 film) =

1928 American horror film

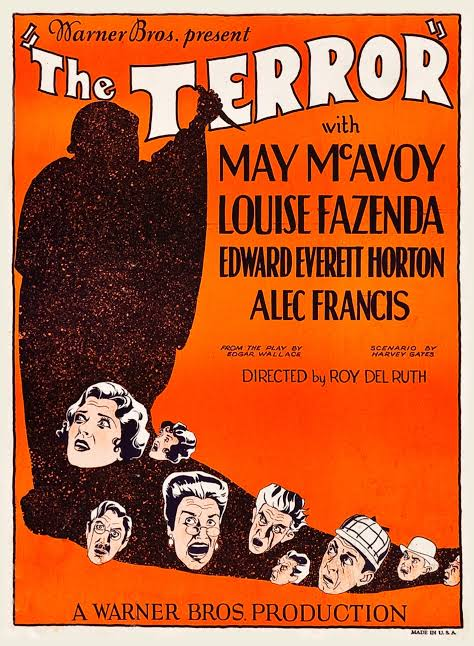
- Theatrical release poster
- Directed by: Roy Del Ruth
- Written by: Harvey Gates; Joseph Jackson
- Based on: The Terror by Edgar Wallace
- Produced by: Darryl F. Zanuck
- Starring: May McAvoy; Louise Fazenda; Edward Everett Horton; Alec B. Francis
- Cinematography: Chick McGill
- Edited by: Thomas Pratt; Jack Killifer
- Music by: Louis Silvers
- Production company: Warner Bros. Pictures
- Distributed by: Warner Bros. Pictures
- Release dates: September 6, 1928 (Sound version); October 28, 1928 (Silent version)
- Running time: 80 minutes (Sound version); 85 minutes (Silent version) (7,674 feet)
- Country: United States
- Language: English
- Budget: $163,000
- Box office: $1,464,000 (worldwide rentals)

The Terror is a lost 1928 American pre-Code horror film written by Harvey Gates and directed by Roy Del Ruth, based on the 1927 play of the same name by Edgar Wallace.

It was the second "all-talking" feature film released by Warner Bros. Pictures, following Lights of New York. It was also the first all-talking horror film, made using the Vitaphone sound-on-disc system.

== Plot ==
After a sensational bank robbery, the ringleader of the gang, Leonard O'Shea—nicknamed The Terror—is still at large. His old accomplices, Soapy Marks and Joe Connors, have completed prison sentences, but O’Shea remains missing with a fortune in stolen gold.

Dr. Redmayne, the proprietor of Monkshall—an eerie English abbey turned rest home—lives in fear. Unknown to his guests, he is being blackmailed by a mysterious figure named Goodman, whom he has promised his daughter Olga in marriage. Olga is horrified by this unwanted engagement.

Monkshall becomes a gathering place for various odd guests. Among them are the eccentric spiritualist Mrs. Elvery, the timid amateur criminologist Alfred Katman, and the silent but observant butler Cotton. One night, a strange man named Ferdinand Fane arrives, claiming his car broke down. Though he appears drunk, Fane soon becomes entangled in the mystery.

Shortly after Fane's arrival, another mysterious guest, Mrs. Ajax arrives. A series of increasingly strange and dangerous events proceed to unfold. After the guests retire they report hearing ghostly organ music, though there is no organ in the house. Next, Olga is attacked by a mysterious figure in her own room. Mrs. Elvery then proposes a séance hoping thereby to get to the bottom of the strange occurrences. During the séance, while the lights are off, Goodman is struck on the head, and when the lights are turned on Mrs. Ajax is found to have been stabbed to death. As the body is inspected it is revealed that Mrs Ajax is actually a man to everyone's surprise! He is eventually identified as Soapy Marks. Fane becomes a suspect to the murder when Olga witnesses him picking up and concealing the murder weapon. From this point, Olga begins to doubt Fane, despite their growing attraction.

Eventually, the famed Scotland Yard detective Superintendent Hallick arrives. He identifies Joe Connors, who had also turned up at Monkshall, and insists the real danger is still at large.

Fane, revealing himself to be Bradley of Scotland Yard, orchestrates a trap using Soapy's corpse as bait. When the killer returns, Fane narrowly avoids being murdered and chases the figure—who abducts Olga—into a secret chamber beneath the house.

In a climactic confrontation, Fane battles the masked assailant near a pit lined with knives. Just as Fane is nearly pushed in, Hallick and the others break through a panel and shoot the attacker, who falls to his death. He is revealed to be O'Shea, alias Goodman, The Terror himself.

With the threat eliminated, the missing bank loot is recovered in the underground lair. Dr. Redmayne confesses he had been coerced by O’Shea, who had posed as his benefactor and manipulated him through threats and fear—including pressuring him into forcing Olga's engagement. Redmayne admits he once attempted to kill Goodman to protect his daughter.

As the dust settles, Olga and Fane (now revealed as a true Scotland Yard man) are seen beginning a romance, with the horrors of Monkshall behind them.

== Cast ==
- May McAvoy as Olga Redmayne
- Louise Fazenda as Mrs. Elvery, a spiritualist
- Edward Everett Horton as Ferdinand Fane, a Scotland Yard detective
- Alec B. Francis as Dr. Redmayne
- Matthew Betz as Joe Connors, a just-released criminal
- Otto Hoffman as "Soapy" Marks, a just-released criminal
- Holmes E. Herbert as Goodman
- Joseph Gerard as Superintendent Hallick
- John Miljan as Alfred Katman
- Frank Austin as Cotton

Cast notes

- The credits are spoken by a caped and masked Conrad Nagel.

== Reception ==
The Terror received mixed reviews upon initial release. In August 1928, Time said the film is "better than The Lion and the Mouse, [an] all-talk picture of which May McAvoy, Alec Francis, two of the terrorized, are veterans." Three months later, John MacCormac, reporting from London for The New York Times upon the film's UK premiere, wrote:

The universal opinion of London critics is that The Terror is so bad that it is almost suicidal. They claim that it is monotonous, slow, dragging, fatiguing and boring, and I am not sure that I do not in large measure agree with them. What is more important, Edgar Wallace, who wrote the film, seems to agree with them also. "Well," was his comment, "I have never thought the talkies would be a serious rival to the stage."

=== Box office ===
According to Warner Bros records the film earned $1,221,000 domestically and $243,000 foreign.

== Preservation status ==
Two versions of the film were prepared, as most theaters in 1928 had yet to convert to sound. The "all-talking" sound version, featuring a Vitaphone sound-on-disc soundtrack, was released on September 6, 1928, and a silent version, which used screen-filling printed "titles" (as they were then commonly called) to supply the essential dialog, was released on October 20, 1928. Both versions have been considered lost films since the 1970s, though a complete set of the soundtrack discs still exists and is preserved at the UCLA Film and Television Archive.

== Remake ==
The Terror was partially remade by First National as Return of the Terror (1934).

Four years later, in 1938, a new remake was directed by Richard Bird with a screenplay by William Freshman. It starred Wilfrid Lawson, Bernard Lee, Arthur Wontner, Linden Travers, Henry Oscar, and Iris Hoey.

The film was again remade in Germany in 1965 as Der unheimliche Mönch (The Sinister Monk).

== See also ==
- Films based on Edgar Wallace works
- List of incomplete or partially lost films
- List of early sound feature films (1926–1929)
- List of early Warner Bros. sound and talking features
