= The House Opposite (1931 film) =

1931 film directed by Walter Summers

- Contemporary trade advertisement from The Daily Film Renter (16 March 1932)
- Directed by: Walter Summers
- Written by: Walter Summers
- Based on: The House Oppsosite by Joseph Jefferson Farjeon
- Produced by: Walter Summers
- Starring: Henry Kendall; Frank Stanmore; Arthur Macrae
- Cinematography: Bert Ford; James Wilson
- Production company: British International Pictures
- Distributed by: Pathé Pictures
- Release date: 22 March 1932
- Running time: 66 minutes
- Country: United Kingdom
- Language: English

The House Opposite is a 1931 British crime film directed by Walter Summers and starring Henry Kendall, Frank Stanmore and Arthur Macrae. It was written by Summers based on the 1931 novel The House Opposite by Joseph Jefferson Farjeon, and was made as a quota quickie at Elstree Studios outside London. A police officer pursues a gang of blackmailers.

== Preservation status ==
The British Film Institute National Archive holds a collection of stills but no film or video materials.

== Plot ==
Young detective Hobart tracks down the headquarters of a gang of blackmailers, surveils them from the empty house opposite. He is trapped by the gang, but escapes during a fire.

== Cast ==
- Henry Kendall as Hobart
- Frank Stanmore as Ben
- Celia Glyn as Nadine
- Arthur Macrae as Randall
- Wallace Geoffrey as Clitheroe
- Renée Macready as Jessica
- Abraham Sofaer as Fahmy
- Molly Lamont as Doris
- Charles Farrell as Wharton

== Reception ==
Film Weekly wrote: "A well-staged fire, a debonaire performance by Henry Kendall, and some simple human comedy in a very naive thriller. Fair entertainment for the indulgent."

Kine Weekly wrote: "Blackmail drama which takes rather a long time to get into its stride, but finishes up with a spectacular fire thrill, which helps to compensate for the leisurely treatment. There is popular humour to relieve the suspense, and an attractive cast of box-office value. Fair, average supporting offering. ... Henry Kendall plays the young detective with breezy bravado."

The Daily Film Renter wrote: "Story rather elementary at times but interest well maintained. Good suspense and humour and realistic fire scenes. Staging generally outstandingly good. ... Generally the directorial work is uneven, but there is a fire staged with good English realism and indeed, the stage work throughout calls for special praise. The occasional story weaknesses are balanced by plentiful humour of a not too subtle variety, and brisk action holds interest to the end."
