= The Terror (1938 film) =

British film by Richard Bird

- Directed by: Richard Bird
- Written by: William Freshman
- Based on: The Terror by Edgar Wallace
- Produced by: Walter C. Mycroft
- Starring: Wilfrid Lawson; Bernard Lee; Arthur Wontner; Linden Travers
- Cinematography: Walter J. Harvey
- Edited by: Lionel Tomlinson
- Music by: Marr Mackie
- Production company: Associated British Picture Corporation
- Distributed by: Associated British Picture Corporation
- Release date: 19 August 1938
- Running time: 73 minutes
- Country: United Kingdom
- Language: English
- Budget: £22,552

The Terror is a 1938 British crime film directed by Richard Bird and starring Wilfrid Lawson, Linden Travers and Bernard Lee. It was based on the 1927 play The Terror by Edgar Wallace (which was adapted from Wallace's 1926 novel The Black Abbot). The play had previously been adapted as the American film The Terror (1928).

== Plot ==
A group of criminals carry out a daring robbery of an armoured van. Two of the criminals are betrayed by the mastermind of the operation. After ten years in prison, they come out and search for the man behind the crimes who betrayed them. But the police are on their tail also wanting to find out who was behind the robbery.

== Production ==
It was shot at Elstree Studios with sets designed by the art director Cedric Dawe.

== Cast ==
- Wilfrid Lawson as Mr. Goodman
- Bernard Lee as Ferdy Fane
- Arthur Wontner as Colonel Redmayne
- Linden Travers as Mary Redmayne
- Henry Oscar as Joe Connor
- Iris Hoey as Mrs. Elvery
- Stanley Lathbury as Hawkins, the butler
- Lesley Wareing as Veronica Elvery
- Alastair Sim as "Soapy" Marx
- John Turnbull as Superintendent Hallick
- Richard Murdoch as Detective Lewis
- Edward Lexy as Inspector Dobie
- Kathleen Harrison as Gladys, the maid
- Irene Handl as kitchen maid

== Critical reception ==
Kinematograph Weekly reported the film did well at the British box office in October 1938.

The Monthly Film Bulletin wrote: "A first class film of its type: excellent craftsmanship and attention to detail combined with superb cutting. Acting of a very high order and dialogue far above general standard. An entertainment film of great merit."

Leslie Halliwell said: "Stilted remake of [The Terror (1928)]."

In British Sound Films: The Studio Years 1928–1959 David Quinlan rated the film as "good", writing: "Very little subtelty but plenty of suspense."
