= Winter Gardens Theatre =

Historic theatre in New Brighton

Coordinates: 53.437513°N 3.047633°W

1937 advertisement

The Winter Gardens Theatre was a theatre and later a cinema in New Brighton on Merseyside. Located in a tourist area close to the New Brighton Tower it catered to both locals and holidaymakers. Originally constructed in 1908, it was rebuilt in 1931 and increasingly used for showing films. These continued until 1959 when it shut as part of nationwide fall in film attendances. Used as bingo hall in the 1960s, it then stood empty for many years before being demolished in 1991. It had a capacity of 1,400 seats.

In the 1920s a number of plays premiered there before heading to the West End including Dorothy Brandon's Araminta Arrives in 1921 and Joseph Jefferson Farjeon's Number 17 in 1925. In February 1927 Edgar Wallace's hit play The Terror appeared at the Winter Gardens before heading to a lengthy London run.

== Bibliography ==
- Wearing, J. P. The London Stage 1920-1929: A Calendar of Productions, Performers, and Personnel. Rowman & Littlefield, 2014.
