= Number 17 (play) =

1925 play by Joseph Jefferson Farjeon

- Written by: Joseph Jefferson Farjeon
- Original language: English
- Genre: Thriller

Premiere
- Date premiered: 6 July 1925
- Place premiered: Winter Gardens Theatre, New Brighton

Number 17 is a 1925 thriller play by the British writer Joseph Jefferson Farjeon.

It premiered at the Winter Gardens Theatre in New Brighton before beginning a West End run of 209 performances, initially at the New Theatre before transferring to Wyndham's and then the Duke of York's Theatre. The original cast included Nicholas Hannen, Fred Groves, Leon M. Lion and Nora Swinburne.

The following year he wrote a novelisation of the play, published by Hodder and Stoughton.

== Adaptations ==
=== Film ===
- 1928, German silent film directed by Géza von Bolváry
- 1932, film Number Seventeen directed by Alfred Hitchcock.
- 1949, Swedish film directed by Gösta Stevens.

=== Television ===
- 1958, programme adapted by Juan Cortés and directed by Cyril Butcher, part of the ITV Play of the Week series.

=== Radio ===
- 1938, for BBC Radio produced by Leslie Stokes.
- 1938, for BBC Radio produced by Howard Rose.

== Bibliography ==
- Goble, Alan. The Complete Index to Literary Sources in Film. Walter de Gruyter, 1999.
- Wearing, J. P. The London Stage 1920-1929: A Calendar of Productions, Performers, and Personnel. Rowman & Littlefield, 2014.
