= The Black Abbot (1963 film) =

1963 film

- Film poster
- Directed by: Franz Josef Gottlieb
- Screenplay by: Johannes Kai; Franz Josef Gottlieb
- Based on: The Black Abbot by Edgar Wallace
- Produced by: Horst Wendlandt; Preben Philipsen
- Starring: Joachim Fuchsberger
- Cinematography: Richard Angst; Rudolf Sandtner
- Edited by: Hermann Haller
- Music by: Martin Böttcher
- Production company: Rialto Film Preben Philipsen GmbH & Co. KG
- Distributed by: Constantin Film
- Release date: 5 July 1963
- Running time: 88 minutes
- Country: West Germany

The Black Abbot (German: Der Schwarze Abt) is a 1963 West German mystery film directed by Franz Josef Gottlieb and starring Joachim Fuchsberger. Adapted from the 1926 novel of the same name, it was part of a very successful series of German films based on the writings of Edgar Wallace.

== Plot ==
The ruins of Fossoway Abbey are supposed to conceal the legendary treasure of the Chelford family, sought by Harry Chelford, last of his line, with fanatical zeal. Due to a hereditary disease, he is liable to fall victim to insanity at any time. His fiancée, Leslie Gine, is more attracted to Dick Alford, Harry's cousin and steward at Chelford Manor. Meanwhile, her brother Arthur, a London lawyer is being blackmailed by his chief clerk Gilder, who wants Leslie for himself. Gilder has purchased some bills of exchange on which Arthur forged the signature of Lord Chelford to pay for his own gambling debts. There is also the 'Black Abbot', a mysterious figure who is seen moving about in the old ruin and supposedly guards the treasure. Inspector Puddler of Scotland Yard and his assistant Horatio are called in when a man is found stabbed to death and they try to solve the mystery. Among the suspects is the butler Fortuna who Puddler recognizes as a former inmate of Dartmoor prison. Mary Wenner, who used to be secretary of Lord Chelford (and an aspirant to become his wife), joins forces with Gilder to find the treasure. They manage to discover some scroll cases containing maps of the abbey but are driven off by the Black Abbot. They later return to find the maps gone. Wenner is shot and killed by Arthur Gine, who himself is later killed in a confrontation with Gilder. Leslie Gine calls off the wedding with Lord Chelford. Lord Chelford, plagued by his deteriorating sanity, completely loses his grip on reality when he encounters his mother (whom he believes to be dead) in the grounds of the manor. Lord Chelford shoots his mother and the Black Abbot, takes Leslie as a hostage and hides with her in the tunnels beneath the abbey after also killing Gilder. It turns out there have been two Black Abbots: one was the butler working as an agent for Gilder, the other was Alford, working with the family doctor Loxon to care for the insane Lady Chelford whom they had kept hidden from her son. There is a shoot-out with the police and Lord Chelford is killed by a cave-in. Among the stones falling on the last Lord Chelford are some chests that contain the treasure.

== Differences from the novel ==
The film follows the novel quite closely over long stretches. However, in the novel Harry and Dick are brothers. Lord Chelford is looking for the elixir of youth that is supposedly part of the treasure, not for the gold. Mary Wenner proposes to marry Arthur Gine as part of a deal to get at the treasure—which in the novel is said to include 15 tons of gold. The novel does not start with a murder like the film. Sergeant Puttler (=Inspector Puddler) initially comes to the castle as a favour to Alford, he is on vacation and wants to spend it doing some light investigative work concerning the strange goings-on around the estate. There is no police assistant in the novel, or comic relief of the kind provided by Arent's character in the film. In fact, the first character to be killed is Thomas, who dies in his Black Abbot costume, just like in the film. Lord Chelford is found to have disappeared from his room, signs of a fight remain behind. Arthur Gine goes abroad after tricking Gilder into signing a large cheque. Later, Leslie Gine is kidnapped. Gilder finds out that Alford is the Black Abbot—he later confesses to it, saying that he used the costume to scare his insane and at times violent brother into staying inside the estate. The end is relatively close to the film with a pursuit through the tunnels and Lord Chelford's death. However, in the novel there is not just a happy ending for Leslie Gine and Dick Alford, but also for Wenner and Gilder who get engaged. Doctor Loxon and Lady Chelford do not appear in the novel at all—she has actually died years before.

== Cast ==
- Joachim Fuchsberger as Dick Alford
- Grit Boettcher as Leslie Gine
- Dieter Borsche as Lord Harry Chelford
- Charles Régnier as Detective Puddler (as Charles Regnier)
- Eva Ingeborg Scholz as Mary Wenner
- Werner Peters as Fabian Gilder
- Alice Treff as Lady Chelford
- Harry Wüstenhagen as Arthur Gine
- Friedrich Schoenfelder as Dr. Loxon
- Eddi Arent as Horatio W. Smith
- Klaus Kinski as Thomas Fortuna

== Production ==
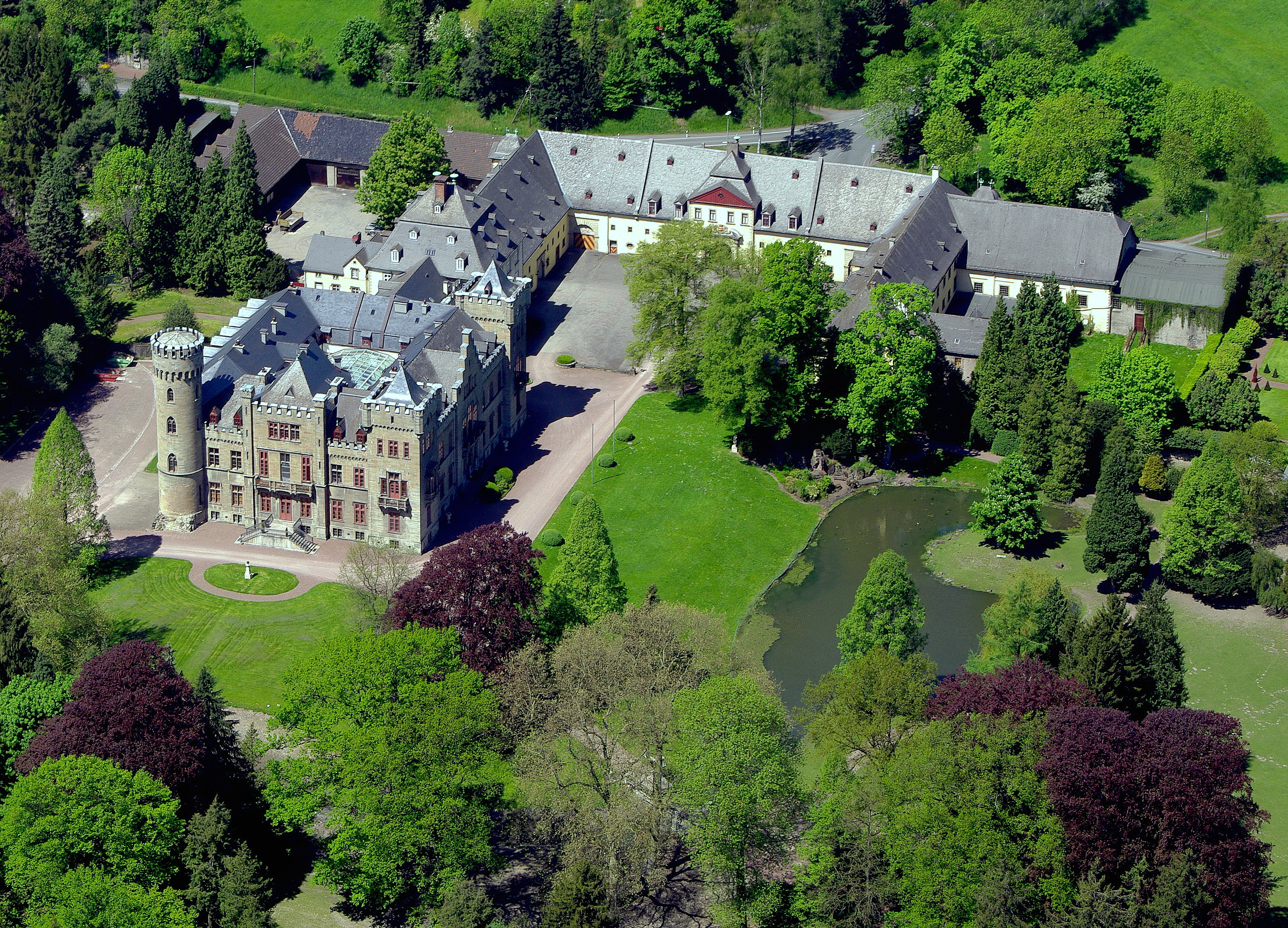
Schloss Herdringen, used as Chelford Manor in the film

Der Schwarze Abt was the 13th in a series of films based on works by Edgar Wallace made in the late 1950s and 1960s by producer Horst Wendlandt for Rialto Film. The script to the film was adapted by Johannes Kai and Franz Josef Gottlieb from the Edgar Wallace novel The Black Abbot (1926). An earlier film version had been made in Britain in 1934. This was the fourth script Kai (a pen name for Hanns Wiedmann) had written for a Wallace film and the plot remained relatively close to the original novel. F.J. Gottlieb had just directed The Curse of the Yellow Snake produced by competitor Artur Brauner and had previously worked on Wallace scripts for Constantin Film. He reworked the script, trying to improve the odds of receiving a favourable age rating from the FSK.

It was one of the earliest films of the series emphasizing the "gothic" elements that came to be a hallmark of the series but were not to be found in Edgar Wallace's original material. Principal cinematography took place from 17 April to 28 May 1963. Interiors and some exteriors were shot at the Spandau Studios in West Berlin. Schloss Herdringen near Arnsberg was used as Chelford Manor. The film was shot in 'Ultra-Scope', a form of CinemaScope. It features opening credits in colour but is otherwise in black-and-white.

The FSK gave the film a rating of 12 and up and found it not appropriate for screenings on public holidays. This was changed from the first rating of 16 and up after some scenes were edited (the killing of Wüstenhagen, Borsche dragging around the unconscious Böttcher and final twitches by Borsche after being buried by masonry).

== Release ==
The Black Abbot was distributed theatrically in Germany on 5 July 1963 by Constantin Film.
