= John Snaith =

English cricketer

John Collis Snaith (24 February 1876 – 8 December 1936) was an English first-class cricketer active 1900 who played for Nottinghamshire. He was born in Nottingham; died in Hampstead. He was also a novelist, writing as J. C. Snaith, and played in the Authors Cricket Club alongside fellow authors A. A. Milne and P. G. Wodehouse among others.

== Works ==
- Mistress Dorothy Marvin: being excerpts from the memoirs of Sir Edward Armstrong, baronet, of Copeland Hall, in the county of Somerset (London: A.D. Innes, 1895) biography
- Fierceheart the Soldier (London: A.D. Innes, 1897)
- Lady Barbarity: a romantic comedy (London: Ward, Lock, 1899)
- Willow the King: the story of a cricket match (London: Ward, Lock, 1899)
- Fortune (London: T. Nelson, 1901)
- Patricia at the Inn (Bristol: J.W. Arrowsmith, 1901)
- Love's Itinerary (New York: D. Appleton, 1902) (possibly previous novel under alternate title)
- The Wayfarers (London: Ward, Lock, 1902)
- Brooke of Covenden (London: Archibald, Constable & Co, 1904)
- Henry Northcote (London: Archibald, Constable & Co, 1906)
- William Jordan Junior (London: Archibald, Constable & Co, 1907)
- Araminta (London: George Bell & Sons, 1909) (revised edition published 1921)
- Mrs. Fitz (London: George Bell & Sons, 1910)
- The Principal Girl (London: Methuen & Co, 1912)
- An Affair Of State (London: Methuen & Co, 1913)
- Anne Feversham (London: D. Appleton, 1914)
- The Great Age (London: T. Hutchinson, 1915)
- The Sailor (London: Elder & Co, 1916)
- The Coming (London: Chatto & Windus, 1917)
- Mary Plantaganet: an improbable story (London: Cassell & Co, 1918)
- The Time Spirit: a romantic tale (New York: D. Appleton, 1918) (possibly Mary Plantaganet under alternate title)
- Love Lane (London: W. Collins Sons & Co, 1919)
- The Undefeated (New York: D. Appleton, 1919) (possibly previous novel under alternate title)
- The Adventurous Lady (London: W. Collins Sons & Co, 1920)
- The Council of Seven (London: W. Collins Sons & Co, 1921)
- The Van Roon (New York: D. Appleton, 1922) (possibly previous novel under alternate title)
- The Crime of Constable Kelly (London: T. Nelson, 1924)
- Time and Tide (London: Hodder & Stoughton, 1924) (possibly also published as There Is A Tide, D. Appleton, 1924)
- Thus Far (London: Hodder & Stoughton, 1925)
- What Is To Be (Che sarà sarà) (London: Hodder & Stoughton, 1926)
- The Hoop (London: Hodder & Stoughton, 1927)
- Surrender (London: Hodder & Stoughton, 1928)
- Cousin Beryl (London: Hodder & Stoughton, 1929)
- The Unforseen (London: Hodder & Stoughton, 1930)
- Indian Summer (London: Hodder & Stoughton, 1931)
- But Even So (London: T. Hutchinson, 1935)
- Curioser and Curioser (London: T. Hutchinson, 1935) (reprinted as Lord Cobbleigh Disappears, D. Appleton, 1936)
- One Of The Ones (London: T. Hutchinson, 1937) posthumous
