= Terry family =

British theatrical dynasty

Top: Kate Terry and Gordon Craig; centre: Ellen Terry; Below: John Gielgud and Phyllis Neilson-Terry

The Terry family was a British theatrical dynasty of the late 19th century and beyond. The family includes not only those members with the surname Terry, but also Neilsons, Craigs and Gielguds, to whom the Terrys were linked by marriage or blood ties.

The dynasty was founded by the actor Benjamin Terry and his wife, Sarah. The first member of the family to achieve national prominence was their eldest surviving daughter, Kate. Her younger sister Ellen achieved international fame, in partnership with Henry Irving. Ellen Terry was seen as the greatest star of the family for many decades, but her great-nephew John Gielgud became at least as celebrated from the 1930s to the end of the 20th century. Among those of the family who did not become actors, Gordon Craig, Ellen's son, was an internationally-known theatre designer and director.

Members of the family who were professionally associated with the theatre, as performers, designers or managers, are given individual paragraphs below. Other members of the family are mentioned in the text.

== Family tree ==
The graphic below is simplified to show the best-known family members. For example, it shows only three of Gordon Craig's eight children. The names of actors and others connected with the theatre are shown in capital letters.

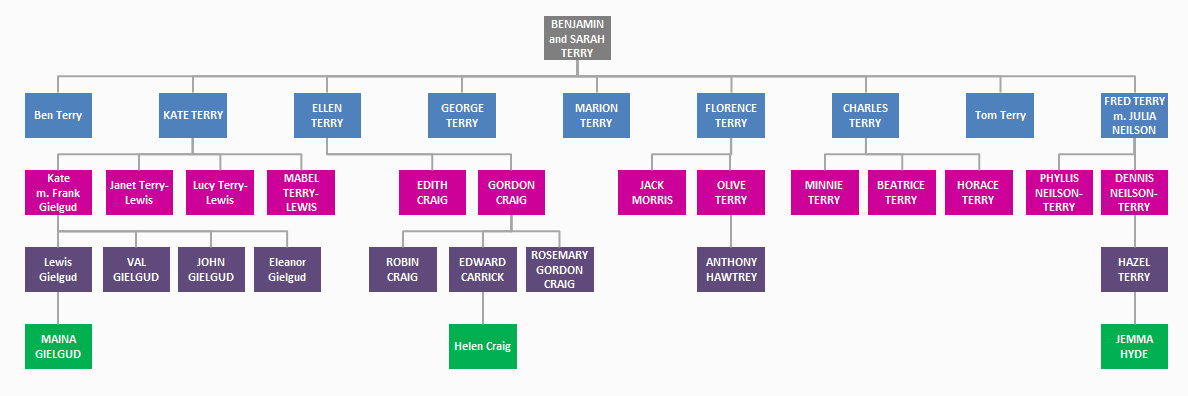

== First generation ==
=== Benjamin Terry and Sarah Ballard ===
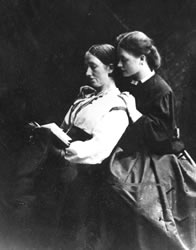
Sarah Terry with her daughter Ellen, circa 1860

Benjamin Terry (1817–1896) (Note: Most sources give Benjamin's year of birth as 1818, but the baptismal records show he was born in October 1817.) was a moderately successful actor in the mid-19th century. His father, also called Benjamin, an innkeeper, married Catherine Crawford in 1838. The younger Benjamin's wife, Sarah, née Ballard (1819–1892), was the daughter of Peter Ballard, a builder and Master Sawyer who worked in Portsmouth. (Note: Some sources state that Sarah's father was a Methodist minister, but the biographer Marguerite Steen notes that Ballard was a Wesleyan lay preacher rather than a cleric.) She had no theatrical connections before meeting Terry and marrying him without her parents' knowledge. She became an actress, adopting the stage name "Miss Yerrett", but it was Terry who was the stronger theatrical influence on their children. He had been a member of William Charles Macready's company, and shared Macready's regard for good diction. His daughter Ellen recalled that he "always corrected me if I pronounced any word in a slipshod fashion, and if I now speak my language well it is in no small degree due to my early training." The couple had eleven children, two of whom died in infancy. (They had been christened Kate and Ellen after their paternal and maternal grandmothers; Benjamin and Sarah reused the names for their next two daughters.) Of the nine children who survived to adulthood only two, the eldest son, Benjamin, and the next to youngest, Tom, had no theatrical history. Benjamin (b. 1839) went into commerce and emigrated to Australia and then India, and Tom (b. 1860), a drifter, lived on the fringes of criminality and poverty, constantly helped by his parents and siblings.

=== Aniela Aszpergerowa ===
The most prominent theatrical forebear on the Gielgud side of the family was the Polish actress Aniela Aszpergerowa (1815–1902), described by her great-grandson John Gielgud as "the greatest Shakespearean actress in all Lithuania". Her husband, Wojciech, was also a famous leading actor. Their daughter, also called Aniela, married Adam Gielgud, who had been born at sea during his parents' flight from Poland after the failed rising against Russian rule in 1830. Their son Frank married Kate Terry's daughter, Kate Terry-Lewis.

== Second generation ==
Listed in order of date of birth.

=== Kate Terry ===
Kate (1844–1924) was the first of the Terry children to make the family name famous on the English stage, beginning her career as a small child. According to the academic Nina Auerbach, Kate may have been the most accomplished actor among her siblings, quickly gaining praise in the plays of Shakespeare, among others. Contemporary critics thought the same: The Manchester Guardian ended its report of her last performance before her retirement: "In our unwilling acceptance of her farewell, we must now rest satisfied with the memory of the peerless beauty of her merry-hearted acting ... like the music of a bewitching melody piercing the stillness of the night, and ending just when the ear longed for the next note." She gave up acting when she married the businessman Arthur James Lewis (1824–1901) in 1867 when she was 23. She made only two later stage appearances, the first in 1898, in a small role supporting her daughter Mabel in a new play in the West End; the second was in 1906 at her sister Ellen's jubilee celebrations at Drury Lane. Of her four children, all daughters, only the youngest, Mabel, followed her into the theatrical profession. The two middle daughters were Janet and Lucy. Kate's eldest daughter, also named Kate, married Frank Gielgud; their four children included Val and John Gielgud.

=== Ellen Terry ===
Ellen (1847–1928) followed her elder sister into the acting profession at an early age. She became the most celebrated of her generation of the family, with a long professional partnership with Henry Irving. She was especially known for her Shakespearian roles.

Ellen Terry's silver jubilee celebrations, 1906. She is on the right in the group of three, centre stage, with her sisters Marion and Kate. Fred is at the far right, his young son Dennis, stands near him in the foreground. All others on the stage are also members of the family.

In her silver jubilee celebrations at Drury Lane in 1906 twenty members of the family appeared onstage with her. They were listed by The Illustrated London News; those in bold type were professional actors or otherwise associated with the theatre:

	relation to Kate	relation to Ellen	notes
**Edith Craig**	niece	daughter	
Peter Craig	great-nephew	grandson	son of Gordon Craig
**Robin Craig**	great-nephew	grandson	son of Gordon Craig
**Rosemary Craig**	great-niece	granddaughter	daughter of Gordon Craig
Geoffrey Morris	nephew	nephew	son of Florence Terry
**Beatrice Terry**	niece	niece	daughter of Charles Terry
**Charles Terry**	brother	brother	
**Dennis [Neilson] Terry**	nephew	nephew	son of Fred Terry
**Fred Terry**	brother	brother	
**George Terry**	brother	brother	
**Horace Terry**	nephew	nephew	son of Charles Terry
**Marion Terry**	sister	sister	
**Kate Terry**	–	sister	
**Ellen Terry**	sister	–	
**Minnie Terry**	niece	niece	daughter of Charles Terry
**Olive Terry**	niece	niece	daughter of Florence Terry
**Phyllis [Neilson] Terry**	niece	niece	daughter of Fred Terry
Kate Terry-Gielgud	daughter	niece	
Janet Terry-Lewis	daughter	niece	
Lucy Terry-Lewis	daughter	niece	
**Mabel Terry-Lewis**	daughter	niece	

The scenery was designed, and the dances arranged, by Ellen's son Gordon Craig.

Ellen Terry married three times, but her two children, Edith and Gordon, were the product of a long-term unmarried relationship with the architect Edward William Godwin.

=== George Terry ===
George (1852 – 22 March 1928) was a theatre business manager and treasurer.

=== Marion Terry ===
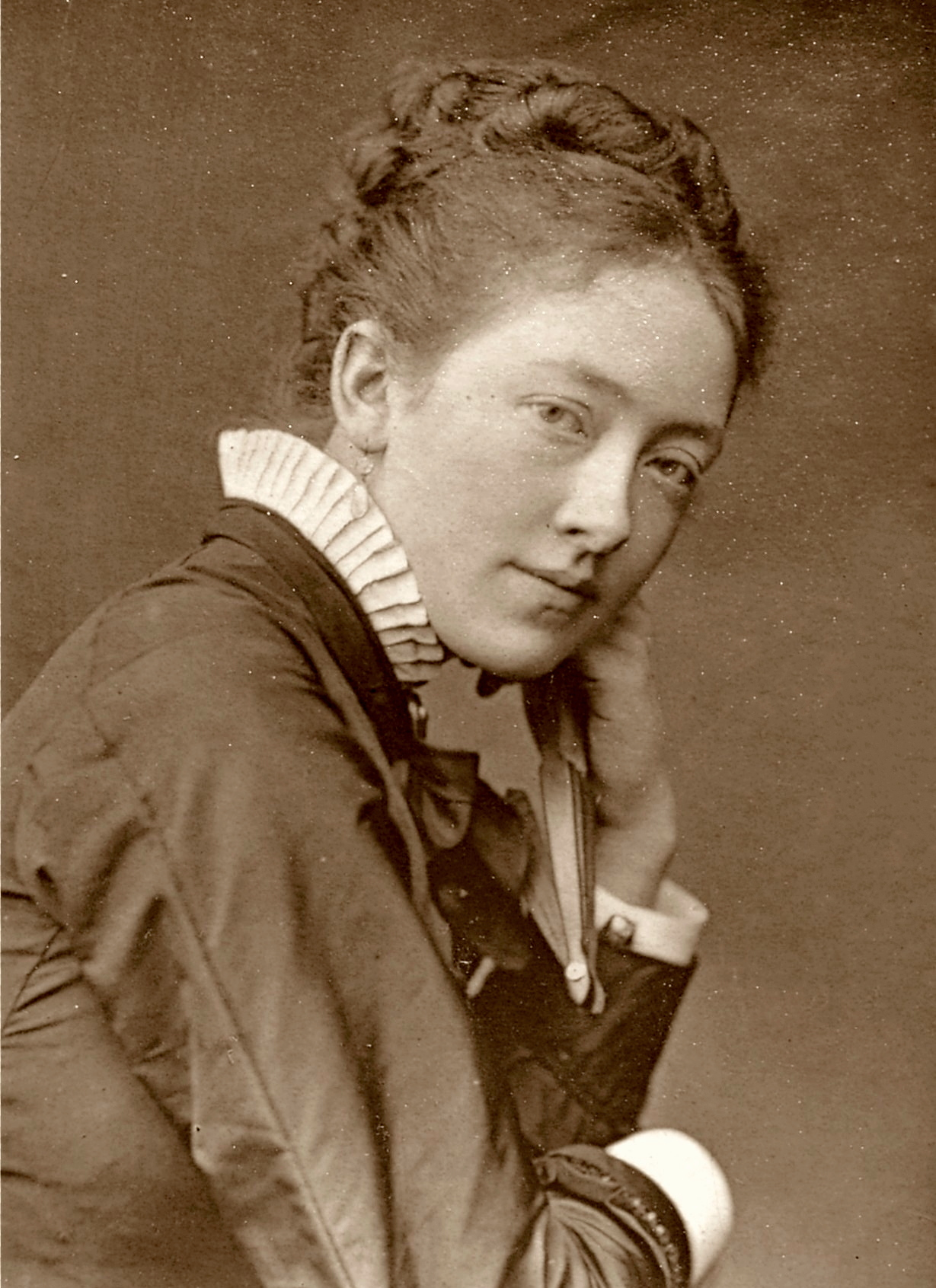
Marion Terry, c. 1890

Marion (1853–1930) had a stage career lasting more than fifty years, becoming known especially for creating roles in the plays of W. S. Gilbert, Oscar Wilde, Henry James and others. When she died, the last of her generation of Terry sisters, The Times printed a leading article about "a long, a strange, a beautiful and affecting story" of Kate, Ellen, Florence and Marion Terry. She never married and had no children.

=== Florence Terry ===
Florence Maud Terry (16 August 1856 – 15 March 1896) like her eldest sister Kate, acted until her marriage and then left the stage. She began her adult stage career in 1870 at the Adelphi Theatre as Lewison in The Robust Invalid. Also in 1870, at the Olympic Theatre, she created the title role in Little Nell, Halliday's stage adaptation of The Old Curiosity Shop. At the Lyceum Theatre, she appeared as Nerissa in The Merchant of Venice and Lady Ellen in The Iron Chest by Colman. Elsewhere, she played the roles of Olivia in Twelfth Night, Lady Betty in Tom Taylor's Lady Clancarty, and in several plays by W. S. Gilbert, including as Dorothy in Dan'l Druce, Blacksmith, Jenny in Sweethearts, Cynisca in Pygmalion and Galatea, Mirza in The Palace of Truth, and with her sister Marion in Gilbert's Broken Hearts (Savoy Theatre, 1882), just before her marriage and retirement. She married a solicitor, William Morris. Of their four children, Olive (known variously as Olive Terry, Olive Morris and Olive Chaplin) and Jack Morris went on the stage.

=== Charles Terry ===
Charles (1858–1933) was a theatre and stage manager. He worked successfully in the Bordeaux wine trade, before moving into theatre management. After a spell working as business manager for Michael Gunn at the Theatre Royal, Dublin, he joined the Compton Comedy Company, with whom he tried acting, without success. The rest of his career was spent working in management. He was box-office manager at the Lyceum Theatre under Irving. His management clients included Ivor Novello. He and his wife Margaret Pratt had three children, Minnie, Horace and Beatrice, all of whom followed a theatrical career.

=== Fred Terry ===
Julia Neilson and Fred Terry in Henry of Navarre, 1909

Fred (1863–1933) was the youngest of the eleven children of Benjamin and Sarah Terry. Fred had a long and successful career on the stage. He was known as a leading man in classic plays but achieved his greatest fame in swashbuckling parts such as the title role in The Scarlet Pimpernel. He married the actress Julia Neilson, with whom he regularly co-starred. Their children, Phyllis and Dennis Neilson-Terry, followed them into acting careers.

=== Julia Neilson ===
Julia Neilson (1868–1957) married Fred Terry in 1891. In a long stage career, she appeared in tragedies and historical romances, often opposite her husband, and was known for her portrayal of Rosalind in a long-running production of As You Like It. When her widowed mother remarried in the 1890s, it was to William Morris, the widower of Florence Terry (above). Julia Neilson thereby became step-sister to Olive Terry and Jack Morris, who were already her niece and nephew by marriage.

Neilson was the first cousin of the actress Hilda Hanbury, whose descendants became the Fox acting dynasty.

== Third generation ==
Listed by alphabetical order of surname

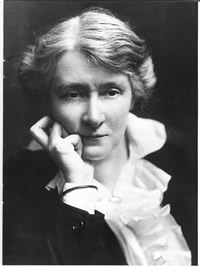
Edith Craig

=== Edith Craig ===
Edith Craig (1869–1947) was the daughter of Ellen Terry and Edward Godwin. She followed her mother into the theatrical profession, first as an actress, and later as a director, producer and designer. From 1911 onwards she staged some 150 plays for the avant-garde theatre society the Pioneers. She also worked in fringe theatres such as the Everyman Theatre, Hampstead. As a lesbian, an active campaigner for women's suffrage, and a woman working as a theatre director, Craig has been studied by feminist scholars as well as theatre historians. Craig lived in a ménage à trois with the dramatist Christabel Marshall and the artist Clare "Tony" Atwood from 1916 until her death. She served as the curator of the Ellen Terry Museum at Smallhythe Place.

=== Gordon Craig ===
Edward Henry Gordon Craig (1872–1966) was the son of Ellen Terry and Edward Godwin. After a modest start as an actor, he became a designer, writer and occasional director of modernist theatre, working in many countries. He was more celebrated in continental Europe than in Britain, and his large theatrical library was bought by the French government for the Collection Auguste Rondel. Among his many children by several women including his wife (the actress, Helen Mary (May) Gibson), the violinist Elena Fortuna Meo (1879–1957), the dancer Isadora Duncan and the poet Dorothy Nevile Lees, were Edward Carrick, Robin Craig and Rosemary Gordon Craig.

=== Jack Morris ===
He was the son of Florence Terry and William Morris and brother of Olive Terry (below). He was an actor.

=== Dennis Neilson-Terry ===
Dennis Neilson-Terry (1895–1932), the only son of Fred Terry and Julia Neilson, and the brother of Phyllis Neilson-Terry, was an actor, manager and producer. His roles included Sebastian in Twelfth Night opposite the Viola of his sister in 1912. In 1932 he and his wife, the actress Mary Glynne, toured southern Africa, where he contracted double pneumonia and died. Their daughter was the actress Hazel Terry.

=== Phyllis Neilson-Terry ===
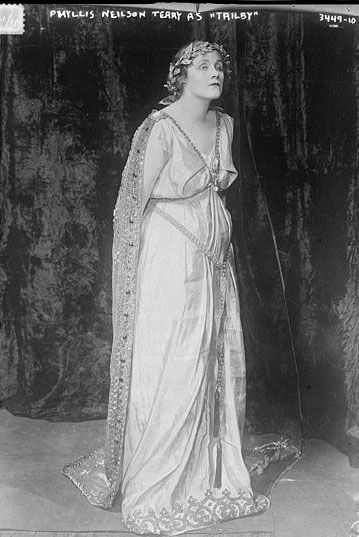
Phyllis Neilson-Terry in the title role of Trilby in 1915

Phyllis Neilson-Terry (1892–1977), daughter of Fred Terry and Julia Neilson, was an actress. After early successes in classic drama she pursued a varied career, including cabaret, pantomime and variety, as well as Shakespeare and other classics. One of her last major roles was in Terence Rattigan's Separate Tables (1954) in the West End and on Broadway.

=== Mabel Terry-Lewis ===
Mabel Terry-Lewis photographed by Bassano in 1920

Mabel Terry-Lewis (1872–1957) was a daughter of Kate Terry and Arthur James Lewis. She made her stage debut in 1895, aged twenty-three. When she married in 1904, she retired from the profession. Her husband died in 1917, and she returned to the stage in 1920. She appeared in the West End and on Broadway in a wide range of plays including revivals of comedies by Wilde and new works by authors such as Noël Coward.

=== Beatrice Terry ===
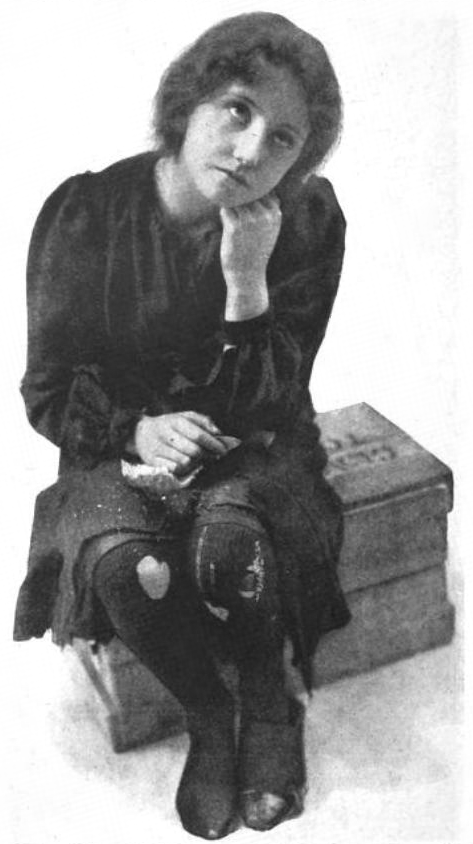
Beatrice Terry in A Little Un-Fairy Princess in 1902

Beatrice Terry (1890 – 17 March 1970) was the younger daughter of Charles Terry. She made her first appearance on the stage at the Lyceum on 7 June 1893 as the baby in Olivia, starring Henry Irving and Ellen Terry. As a child she won praise from The Times for her acting in a stage version of Struwwelpeter in 1900. In 1905 she toured the English provinces and the US with Edward Terry (who was not a relation). The following year she played J. M. Barrie's Peter Pan in London. In 1910 she again toured the US, this time in the company of her uncle and aunt, Fred Terry and Julia Neilson. After this, she spent much of her career in the US. She appeared on Broadway many times between 1903 and 1929, including as Laura Atherton in Children of the Moon by Martin Flavin in 1923 and Lady Sneerwell in The School for Scandal in 1925. She was an original member of the Civic Repertory Theatre in New York, founded by Eva Le Gallienne, in the 1920s. With that company she appeared as Olga in Three Sisters, Aline Solness in John Gabriel Borkman and Olivia in Twelfth Night (all 1927). Beatrice's range was wide. She received good notices in modern light comedy, and in variety, joining Ethel Barrymore and Sir Nigel Playfair in a sketch by Barrie at the London Palladium in 1934. She also played in the classics, in which her roles included, in addition to Olivia and Lady Sneerwell, Ophelia in Hamlet and Titania in A Midsummer Night's Dream. She first married the actor Leonard Mudie and later Geoffrey Marks. In later years, she lived in the Seattle, Washington area.

=== Horace Terry ===
Horace Charles Terry (27 July 1887 – 15 April 1957) was the son of Charles Terry. As a child actor he made his debut in Arthur à Beckett's Faded Flowers at the Garrick in 1895. The piece was a curtain-raiser to Sydney Grundy's A Pair of Spectacles, in which Terry's cousin, Mabel Terry-Lewis made her first stage appearance. The London correspondent of The Boston Evening Transcript wrote that the boy played "very brightly indeed". As an adult, Terry's roles included Colonel Werther in Her Love Against the World at the Lyceum in 1907. He emigrated to the US and married Ethel May Moore at York, Ontario in Canada on 28 August 1912, with whom he had four sons. He became a naturalized US citizen in 1930 and lived for many years at Wyandotte, Michigan, working in a power plant. He died in Wyandotte, aged 69.

=== Minnie Terry ===
Elder daughter of Charles Terry (1 January 1882 – 1964), born in Bordeaux, France. She was a celebrated child actress, receiving praise from The Times for her performance in Herbert Beerbohm Tree's company in 1888. After playing children's parts for seven years she returned to school, first at a boarding school in England, which she hated, and then, more congenially, at a finishing school at Fontainebleau, near Paris. Two years after her return to the stage in the late 1890s, she played Lydia Languish in a production of The Rivals in which Edmund Gwenn was also appearing. They married in 1901, and Minnie had thoughts of leaving the stage, as some her aunts had done on marriage. She accompanied Gwenn to Australia, in which he played in a disastrous tour of Ben Hur; the failure prompted her to restore the family finances by accepting an engagement from J. C. Williamson. When the couple returned to England in 1904, Minnie appeared mostly in modern comedies, interspersed with occasional historical dramas. She and Gwenn co-starred in a farce called What the Butler Saw in 1905. When, in 1911, Irene Vanbrugh made her debut in variety, she chose Minnie Terry and Gwenn to join her in a short play specially written by Barrie. In 1914 she played a Broadway season as Princess Thora in a dramatisation of Andersen's The Garden of Paradise. During the First World War, her marriage was dissolved. She remarried but remained on affectionate terms with Gwenn. In their old age, he travelled from his home in California for a reunion with his widowed ex-wife in 1956. Who's Who in the Theatre lists no performances by Minnie after October 1925, but in a special BBC radio broadcast to mark Ellen Terry's 80th birthday in 1928, she joined other members of the family – Mabel Terry-Lewis and John Gielgud – together with other leading performers, in scenes from Shakespeare associated with Ellen.

=== Olive Terry ===
Olive Morris Chaplin (22 April 1884 – 9 November 1969) was the daughter of Florence Terry and William Morris. She made her first appearance on stage in her native London in February 1906, as Lady Gerania in Dr Wake's Patient, in which she subsequently toured. In 1906 she appeared in Arthur Bourchier's production of Macbeth at the Garrick. Later London appearances were as Lily in In the Workhouse (1911), Sister Christina in The Month of Mary (1913), and Spring in Godefroi and Yolande (1915). She later married Charles Chaplin (not the famous film comedian) with whom she had a son, Michael. By an earlier relationship with the actor Charles Hawtrey she had a son, Anthony Hawtrey, who became an actor. She served as the curator of the Ellen Terry Museum after the death of Edith Craig. By the 1930s she was living near the museum with the architect Lucy "Lucien" Gow.

== Fourth generation ==
Listed by alphabetical order of surname:

=== Edward Carrick ===
Edward Anthony Craig (1905–1998), who used the pen name Edward Carrick, was the third child and first son of Gordon Craig and Elena Fortuna Meo. He worked in the cinema as an art director, and designed three productions of Macbeth for stage and television between 1932 and 1960.

=== Robin Craig ===
He was a son of Gordon Craig, listed in the 1925 Who's Who in the Theatre as an actor.

=== John Gielgud ===
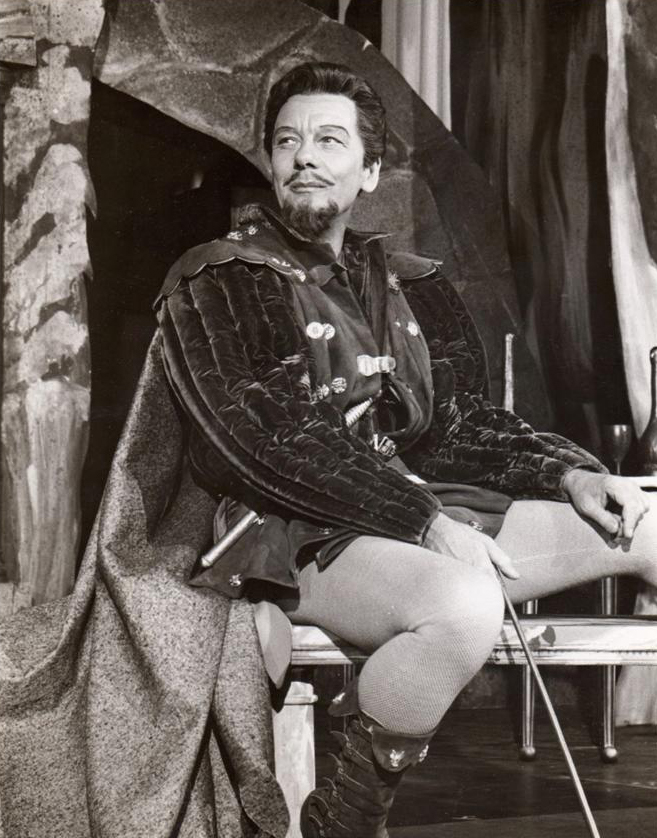
John Gielgud as Benedick in Much Ado About Nothing in 1959

Sir Arthur John Gielgud (1904–2000) was one of the leading actors of the middle and late 20th century. Along with Ralph Richardson and Laurence Olivier he dominated the English stage for several decades from the 1930s. He was particularly noted for his beautiful speaking voice and his mastery of Shakespearean verse. Later in his career he made more than sixty films. He was a son of Kate Terry-Lewis and Frank Gielgud, and his brothers were Val and Lewis (below).

=== Lewis Gielgud ===
Lieut-Col Lewis Evelyn Gielgud (1894–1953) was a son of Kate Terry-Lewis and Frank Gielgud. He was the elder brother of Val and John (below and above) and became a senior figure in the Red Cross and UNESCO. He also wrote two novels, Red Soil and The Wise Child, a travel book, About It and About, and three plays in collaboration with Naomi Mitchison, The Price of Freedom, As It Was in the Beginning, and Full Fathom Five (1932). With his wife, Zita Gordon, he wrote radio plays; ballerina Maina Gielgud is their only child.

=== Val Gielgud ===
Val Henry Gielgud (1900–1981) was a BBC radio executive and author, the second of the four children of Frank Henry Gielgud and Kate Terry-Lewis. In an obituary, The Times called him "for 35 years the moving force in BBC radio drama". His brothers were John and Lewis (above).

=== Rosemary Gordon Craig ===
A daughter of Gordon Craig, listed in the 1925 Who's Who in the Theatre as an actress.

=== Anthony Hawtrey ===
Anthony John Hawtrey (1909–1954), son of Olive Terry and Charles Hawtrey, was an actor. He appeared in six feature films between 1943 and 1948, and played leading roles in early post-war BBC television plays. He appeared as the King of France in the Old Vic's production of King Lear in 1931, when his cousin John Gielgud played Lear and Ralph Richardson played Kent. He was also a well-known producer and director, both in London and in the provinces.

=== Hazel Terry ===
Hazel Terry (1918–1974) was an actress whose roles ranged from Shakespeare (including Ophelia to the Hamlet of her cousin John Gielgud in 1944) to modern works, including a year-long engagement playing Amanda in Coward's Private Lives.

== Fifth generation ==
Among the fifth generation of the family are the ballet dancer Maina Gielgud, daughter of Lewis Gielgud; the actress Jemma Hyde, daughter of Hazel Terry; and the author and illustrator Helen Craig, daughter of Edward Carrick.

== Sources ==
- Auerbach, Nina (1997). Ellen Terry: Player in Her Time. University of Pennsylvania Press; W W Norton. ISBN 0-8122-1613-X.
- Collis, Rose (2016). Portraits to the Wall: Historic Lesbian Lives Unveiled. Bloomsbury Publishing. ISBN 978-1474287074.
- Gaye, Freda, ed. (1967). Who's Who in the Theatre (fourteenth ed.). London: Sir Isaac Pitman and Sons. OCLC 5997224.
- Gielgud, John (1979). An Actor and His Time. London: Sidgwick and Jackson. ISBN 0283985739.
- Hunt, Bampton (ed.). The Green Room Book; or, Who's Who on the Stage. London and New York: T S Clark and F Warne and Co. OCLC 39940222.
- Manvell, Roger (1968). Ellen Terry. London: Heinemann. ISBN 0434450006.
- McDonald, Russ (2005). Look to the Lady: Sarah Siddons, Ellen Terry, and Judi Dench on the Shakespearean Stage. University of Georgia Press. ISBN 978-0820325064.
- Morley, Sheridan (2001). John G – The Authorised Biography of John Gielgud. London: Hodder and Stoughton. ISBN 0340368039.
- Parker, John, ed. (1925). Who's Who in the Theatre (fifth ed.). London: Sir Isaac Pitman and Sons. OCLC 10013159.
- Parker, John, ed. (1933). Who's Who in the Theatre (seventh ed.). London: Sir Isaac Pitman and Sons. OCLC 18995487.
- Parker, John, ed. (1957). Who's Who in the Theatre (twelfth ed.). London: Sir Isaac Pitman and Sons. OCLC 6345062.
- Pemberton, Thomas Edgar (1902). Ellen Terry and her Sisters. London: C Arthur Pearson. OCLC 503670267.
- Steen, Marguerite (1962). A Pride of Terrys – A Family Saga. London: Longmans. OCLC 1443983.
