= Return of the Terror =

1934 film by Howard Bretherton

- Theatrical release poster
- Directed by: Howard Bretherton
- Screenplay by: Peter Milne; Eugene Solow
- Based on: The Terror (1927 play) by Edgar Wallace
- Produced by: Samuel Bischoff
- Starring: Mary Astor; Lyle Talbot; John Halliday; Frank McHugh
- Cinematography: Arthur L. Todd
- Edited by: Owen Marks
- Music by: Bernhard Kaun
- Production company: First National Pictures
- Distributed by: Warner Bros. Pictures
- Release date: July 7, 1934
- Running time: 65 minutes
- Country: United States
- Language: English

Return of the Terror is a 1934 American mystery film directed by Howard Bretherton and written by Peter Milne and Eugene Solow. The film stars Mary Astor, Lyle Talbot, John Halliday, and Frank McHugh, and features Robert Barrat and Irving Pichel. The film was released by Warner Bros. Pictures on July 7, 1934. It was a loose remake of the 1928 film The Terror, based on Edgar Wallace's play of the same name, rather than a sequel. It shifted the setting from England to America.

== Plot ==
Doctor John Redmayne, on trial for the death of four patients at the sanatorium he ran and branded "The Terror" by the press, claims insanity on the advice of his lawyer and is sent to the lunatic asylum. Six months later, fearing he really is going mad, he escapes and returns to his sanatorium. There he encounters again his former lover Olga and his colleague Doctor Goodman, who may have had a hand in the original deaths.

== Cast ==
- Mary Astor as Olga Morgan
- Lyle Talbot as Dr. Leonard Goodman
- John Halliday as Dr. John Redmayne
- Frank McHugh as Joe Hastings
- Robert Barrat as Pudge Walker
- Irving Pichel as Daniel Burke
- George E. Stone as Soapy McCoy
- J. Carrol Naish as Steve Scola
- Frank Reicher as Franz Reinhardt
- Robert Emmett O'Connor as Inspector Bradley
- Renee Whitney as Virginia Mayo
- Etienne Girardot as Mr. Tuttle
- Maude Eburne as Mrs. Elvery
- Charley Grapewin as Jessup
- George Humbert as Tony
- Edmund Breese as Editor
- George Cooper as Cotton
- Cecil Cunningham as Miss Doolittle
- Frank Conroy as Prosecuting Attorney
- Howard Hickman as Judge
- Lorena Layson as Maid
- Harry Seymour as City Reporter
- Philip Morris as Guard
- Bert Moorhouse as First Trooper
- Eddie Shubert as Second Trooper

== Reception ==
A.D.S. of The New York Times said, "The Return of the Terror has been managed with the usual Hollywood skill in the physical properties, but its structure has a carpentered look. As the suspicious reporter, Frank McHugh creates a few laughs, but the writing is strictly routine and the necessary humor is largely absent. Robert Emmett O'Connor is excellent as a hard-boiled detective, and the other principals, John Halliday, Mary Astor, Lyle Talbot and Robert Barrat, are entirely satisfactory."

== Preservation status ==
A 35mm print has been preserved by the Library of Congress, and a 16mm print of this film survives at the Wisconsin Center for Film and Theater Research. It was transferred onto 16mm film by Associated Artists Productions in the 1950s and shown on television.

== Bibliography ==
- Pitts, Michael R. Thrills Untapped: Neglected Horror, Science Fiction and Fantasy Films, 1928-1936. McFarland, 2018.
