= Dennis Neilson-Terry =

British actor and theatre manager (1895–1932)

Neilson-Terry in British army uniform of the First World War

Dennis Neilson-Terry (21 October 1895 – 14 July 1932) was a British actor, theatre manager and producer, who starred in a number of films between 1917 and 1932.

He was the son of the actor Fred Terry and his wife, the actress Julia Neilson. In his early years he had been seen as a rising Shakespearean. After the First World War he specialised, as his parents had done before him, in less demanding roles in ephemeral but popular and profitable plays. While touring in southern Africa with such a repertory he contracted pneumonia and died at the age of 36.

== Life and career ==
=== Family ===
Dennis Neilson-Terry was born in London into the Terry family of actors. His parents were Fred Terry and his wife Julia Neilson; his older sister was the actress Phyllis Neilson-Terry; and his aunt was Ellen Terry. He married the actress Mary Glynne and was the father of the actress Hazel Terry.

=== Early years ===
Neilson-Terry was educated at Charterhouse School and made his stage debut at Drury Lane on 12 June 1906, as a page in Much Ado About Nothing, as part of Ellen Terry's Jubilee celebrations. He made his first regular appearance on the stage under the name of Derrick Dennis, at the New Theatre in May 1911, as Silvius in As You Like It. In his parents' company he played Armand St Just in The Scarlet Pimpernel, after which he widened his Shakespearean repertoire during a year's tour with F R Benson's company, playing Lorenzo (The Merchant of Venice, Silvius, Rosencrantz in Hamlet, Paris in Romeo and Juliet, Octavius Caesar in Antony and Cleopatra, Demetrius in A Midsummer Night's Dream and Malcolm in Macbeth.

In 1912, under Herbert Beerbohm Tree's management, Neilson-Terry played Sebastian in Twelfth Night opposite the Viola of his sister. For Lillah McCarthy and Harley Granville-Barker he played Florizel in The Winter's Tale, and Sebastian in Twelfth Night later in 1912. The Times praised his "dainty" playing in the former, and commented that he was "evidently gifted with a full measure of the family talent."

=== Leading man ===
In 1913 Neilson-Terry was given his first starring role, in Romeo and Juliet. The Manchester Guardian said:

Mr Dennis Neilson-Terry looks a perfect Romeo – so extremely decorative and suitable. He has, for a start, the supreme advantage of being very young in every way. He is a wistful, wide-eyed, bewildered Romeo, with whom you cannot but be sympathetic. ... But being very young has its drawbacks, too, and Mr Terry lacks the power to be convincingly passionate in his lovemaking. That may come with riper years. … But he gives a quite definite and pleasing presentation of a difficult part, and in doing so he discloses that he has most of the qualities that go to make a popular actor, if not a very great one.

Neilson-Terry's roles between then and the First World War included Louis Dubedat in The Doctor's Dilemma (1913), and Oberon in A Midsummer Night's Dream (1914). The reviewer in The Times said of his performance in the latter that he dominated the whole play, "informs it with graciousness and majesty … and exquisite rhythmic beauty."

During the war Neilson-Terry served in the Royal West Surrey Regiment, and was demobilised in 1917, when he resumed his theatrical career. In his post-war productions he opted for crowd-pleasing, light plays, as his father had done before him. As The Manchester Guardian put it, "Before the war Mr Neilson-Terry was characteristically a Shakespearean and romantic actor. After the war he put on horned spectacles and a scarf, resembled Mr Harold Lloyd of the films, and acted 'silly ass' detectives who were cleverer than they looked." Of his later stage productions, one performance stood out: that of a frightened man in a haunted room in Ned Lathom's play Fear, which, the Guardian critic wrote, "signalled unmistakably that Neilson-Terry was a developing actor with his best work still to come".

Together with his wife, Neilson-Terry made successful appearances in New York and South Africa, and it was after a tour of the latter that he contracted pneumonia, and died in Bulawayo, Southern Rhodesia, at the age of 36. His body was taken back to England, and his funeral service was held at St Paul's, Covent Garden. He was buried in Hampstead Cemetery.

== Filmography ==
| Year | Film | Role |
|---|---|---|
| 1916 | Her Greatest Performance | Gerald Lovelace |
| 1917 | Masks and Faces | Ernest Vane |
| 1919 | His Last Defence | Arthur Dawson |
| 1920 | Desire | Raphael Valentin |
| 1920 | The Hundredth Chance | Lord Saltash |
| 1922 | The Flight of the King (short) | King Charles II |
| 1922 | A Story of Nell Gwynne (short) | King Charles II |
| 1930 | The House of the Arrow | Inspector Hanaud |
| 1931 | 77 Park Lane | Lord Brent |
| 1932 | Murder at Covent Garden | Jack Trencham |
