= Kate Terry =

English actress (1844–1924)

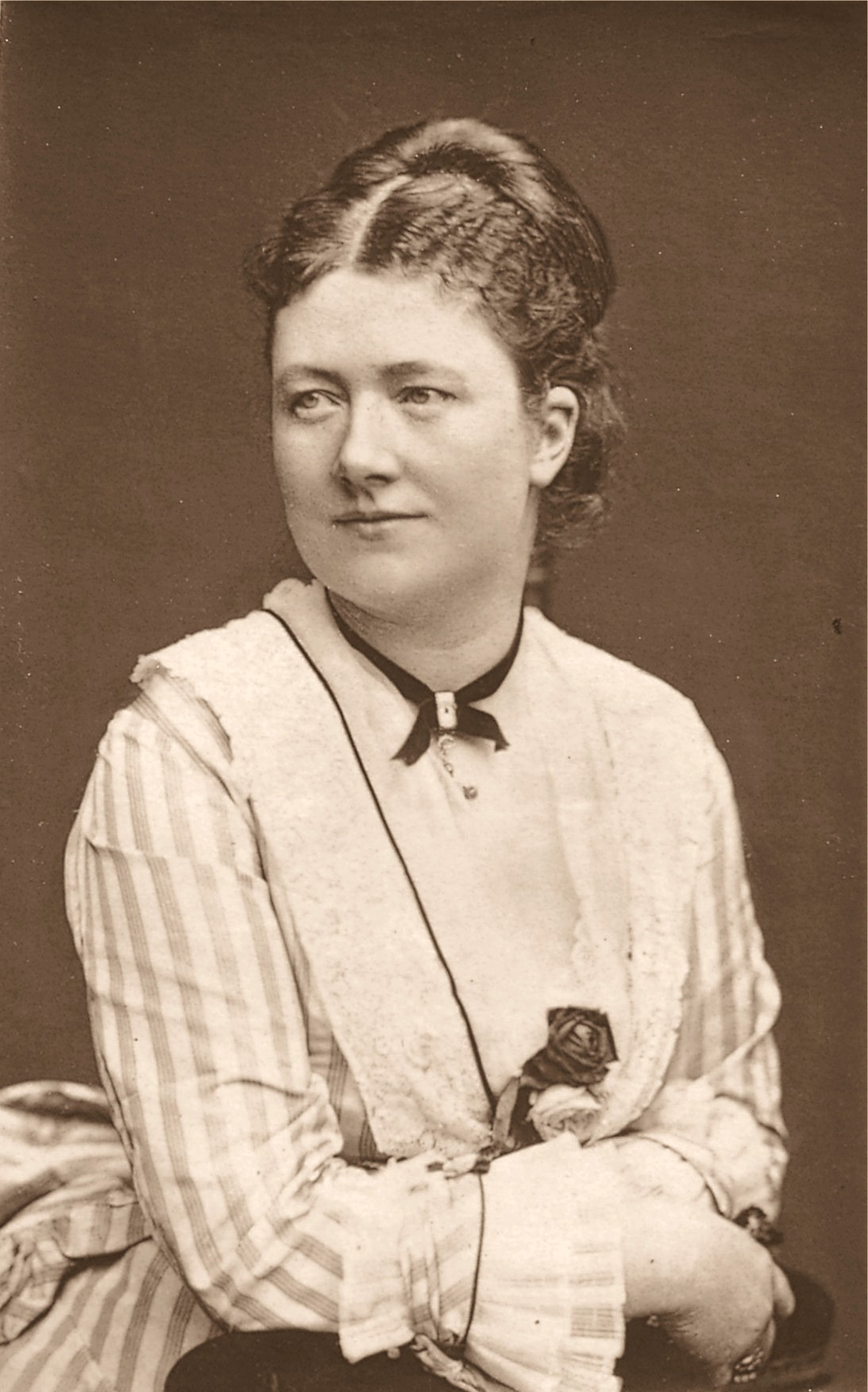
Kate Terry

Kate Terry (21 April 1844 – 6 January 1924) was an English actress. The elder sister of the actress Ellen Terry, she was born into a theatrical family, made her debut when still a child, became a leading lady in her own right, and left the stage in 1867 to marry. In retirement she commented that she was 20 years on the stage, yet left it when she was only 23. Her grandson was the actor and theatre director John Gielgud.

== Biography ==
=== Early years ===
Terry was born in Falmouth, England, into a theatrical family. Her parents, Benjamin (1818–1896) and Sarah (née Ballard; 1817–1892), were comic actors in a touring company based in Portsmouth. Kate was the oldest surviving child of eleven, five of whom became actors: Ellen, Florence, Fred, Kate and Marion. Two other children, George and Charles, were connected with theatre management. Terry's grandson, John Gielgud, became one of the twentieth century's most respected actors.

=== Stage career ===
Terry began her career as a child actress in Bristol and then with the company of Charles Kean in Shakespeare productions at London's Princess's Theatre, where in 1851 she made her London debut playing Robin in a juvenile production of The Merry Wives of Windsor, and in 1852 she played the juvenile role of Prince Arthur in King John. She repeated the part in a command performance for Queen Victoria. The historian and poet Lord Macaulay was present and wrote in his diary that it was "worth having passed middle age to have seen little Kate Terry as Prince Arthur."

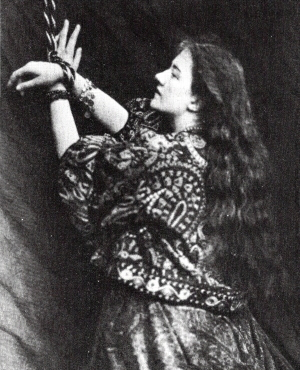
Terry as Andromeda, photographed by Lewis Carroll in 1865

Terry played Ariel in The Tempest in 1857, and in 1858, when she was only 15, Kean gave her an adult role, Cordelia in King Lear. Beginning in 1859, she toured for two years with her sister Ellen, accompanied by their parents and a musician, in "the kind of entertainment of which the German Reed productions were the last surviving examples, an entertainment of duologues and recitations, given in town halls and assembly rooms for the benefit of those people who like to be amused but would never consent to enter a theatre." In 1861, she returned to London to play Ophelia in Hamlet. Over the next five years, she performed at several theatres in the West End, becoming one of the best-known leading ladies in London. At the Lyceum Theatre, she appeared in The Duke's Motto in 1863 and Bel Demonio in 1864. At the Olympic Theatre the same year, she appeared in The Hidden Hand. In 1863 Charles Dickens said of her performance in The Lady of Lyons, "That is the very best piece of womanly tenderness I have ever seen on the stage, and you'll find that no audience can miss it."

In 1866 she appeared in Dion Boucicault's Hunted Down alongside Henry Irving, who later formed a famous partnership with her sister Ellen. The same year, she joined the company at the Adelphi Theatre. There, in 1866, she appeared in A Sheep in Wolf's Clothing, followed in the same season by Ethel; or, Only a Life, an adaptation by Benjamin Webster, Jr., of Une Pauvre Fille. Of her performance in the latter piece, The Times wrote that "what would be utterly ineffective and wearisome in the keeping of an ordinary actress, she renders effective and interesting by the natural interpretation of the character." This was soon followed by A Sister's Penance by Tom Taylor and Augustus Dubourg. With J. L. Toole, for the Christmas season of 1866, she appeared in a new burlesque, The Mountain Dhu by Andrew Halliday. Beginning in June 1867, she starred in Dora, by Charles Reade based on Lord Tennyson's poem. In July 1867, she played Beatrice in Much Ado about Nothing.The Times commented: "We can remember no such Beatrice, and we find it difficult to conceive a better." She then made her farewell to the West End as Juliet in Romeo and Juliet, in August, to great acclaim.

John Gielgud calculated that his grandmother played about 100 roles in her short career. Her last stage appearance before her retirement was in October 1867 at the Prince's Theatre, Manchester, in Tom Taylor's Plot and Passion. The Manchester Guardian ended its report on the performance: "In our unwilling acceptance of her farewell, we must now rest satisfied with the memory of the peerless beauty of her merry-hearted acting... like the music of a bewitching melody piercing the stillness of the night, and ending just when the ear longed for the next note."

=== Later years ===
After her farewell performances, she left the stage to marry the wealthy haberdasher and silk merchant Arthur James Lewis (of the firm Lewis & Allenby). The couple had four daughters, the eldest of whom was also named Kate (the mother of Gielgud). The youngest, Mabel Terry-Lewis, became an actress. Terry made two later appearances on stage: first in 1898, in Stuart Ogilvie's The Master, with John Hare and her daughter Mabel, and in June 1906 she played Ursula in a scene from Much Ado About Nothing at the gala stage celebration of her sister Ellen's jubilee.

Terry and her husband lived in considerable style in Moray Lodge in Kensington, London, where he hosted the Moray Minstrels, until Lewis lost all his money. After that, in Gielgud's words, "my grandmother lived very simply and rather resentfully in an ugly little house in West Cromwell Road, and she had no grand clothes and did not give parties any more. She played bridge and had paying guests. This was a sad ending to her career but she never grumbled or groused. She must have hated being out of the picture, even though many people still recognized her and paid court to her."

Terry died in London, aged 79.

== See also ==
- Terry family
