= The Black Abbot (novel) =

1926 novel by Edgar Wallace

- Early edition
- Author: Edgar Wallace
- Language: English
- Genre: Crime
- Publisher: Hodder & Stoughton
- Publication date: 1926
- Publication place: United Kingdom
- Media type: Print

The Black Abbot is a crime novel by the British writer Edgar Wallace which was first published in 1926 about the ghost of an abbot haunting the grounds of an old abbey and protecting a lost treasure.

The following year Wallace turned the story into a play The Terror which itself had several film adaptations.

== Film adaptation ==
It was adapted in 1963 by the German studio Rialto Film as The Black Abbot as part of a long-running series of Wallace adaptations made by the company.

== Bibliography ==
- Goble, Alan. The Complete Index to Literary Sources in Film. Walter de Gruyter, 1999.
