= Reginald Eves =

British artist (1876–1941)

Reginald Eves RA
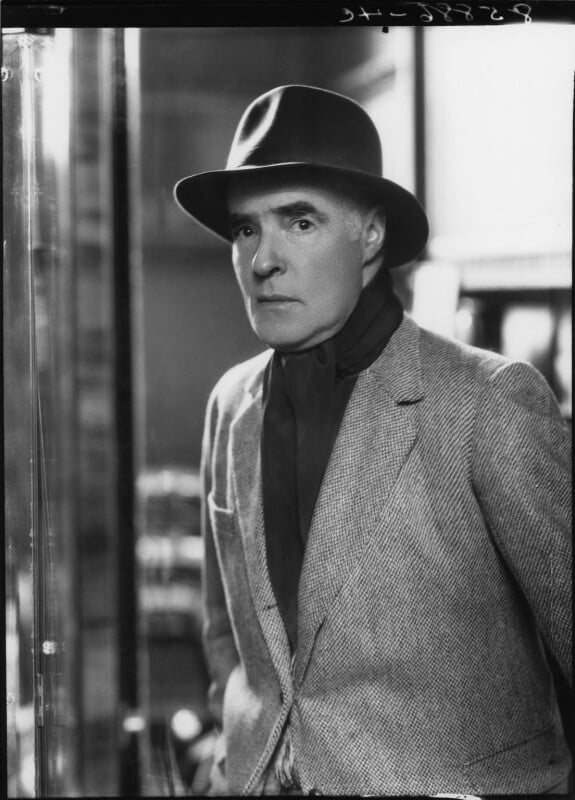
- Eves in 1939
- Born: Reginald Grenville Eves; 24 May 1876; London, England
- Died: 13 June 1941 (aged 65); Middleton-in-Teesdale, County Durham, England
- Education: Slade School of Fine Art
- Known for: painting
- Spouse: Bertha Sybil Papillon (m.1903)
- Elected: Royal Academy (elected 1939); Royal Society of Portrait Painters; Royal Institute of Oil Painters

Reginald Grenville Eves RA (24 May 1876 – 13 June 1941) was a British painter who made portraits of many prominent military, political and cultural figures between the two world wars.

== Biography ==
Eves was born in 1876, the son of William Henry Eves, a London JP. He was educated at University College School and later at the Slade School of Fine Art, between 1891 and 1895, where he studied under Alphonse Legros, Frederick Brown and Henry Tonks. After the Slade, he lived and worked in Yorkshire for five years, before returning to London. In 1901 he had his first work shown at the Royal Academy. Eves exhibited in Paris several times and won a silver medal in 1924 and a gold medal in 1926 at the Paris Salon. He was elected as an Associate of the Royal Academy in 1933 and a Royal Academician in 1939. Eves established a successful society portrait practice in London and his subjects included Thomas Hardy, Sir Ernest Shackleton, George VI and Sir Max Beerbohm.

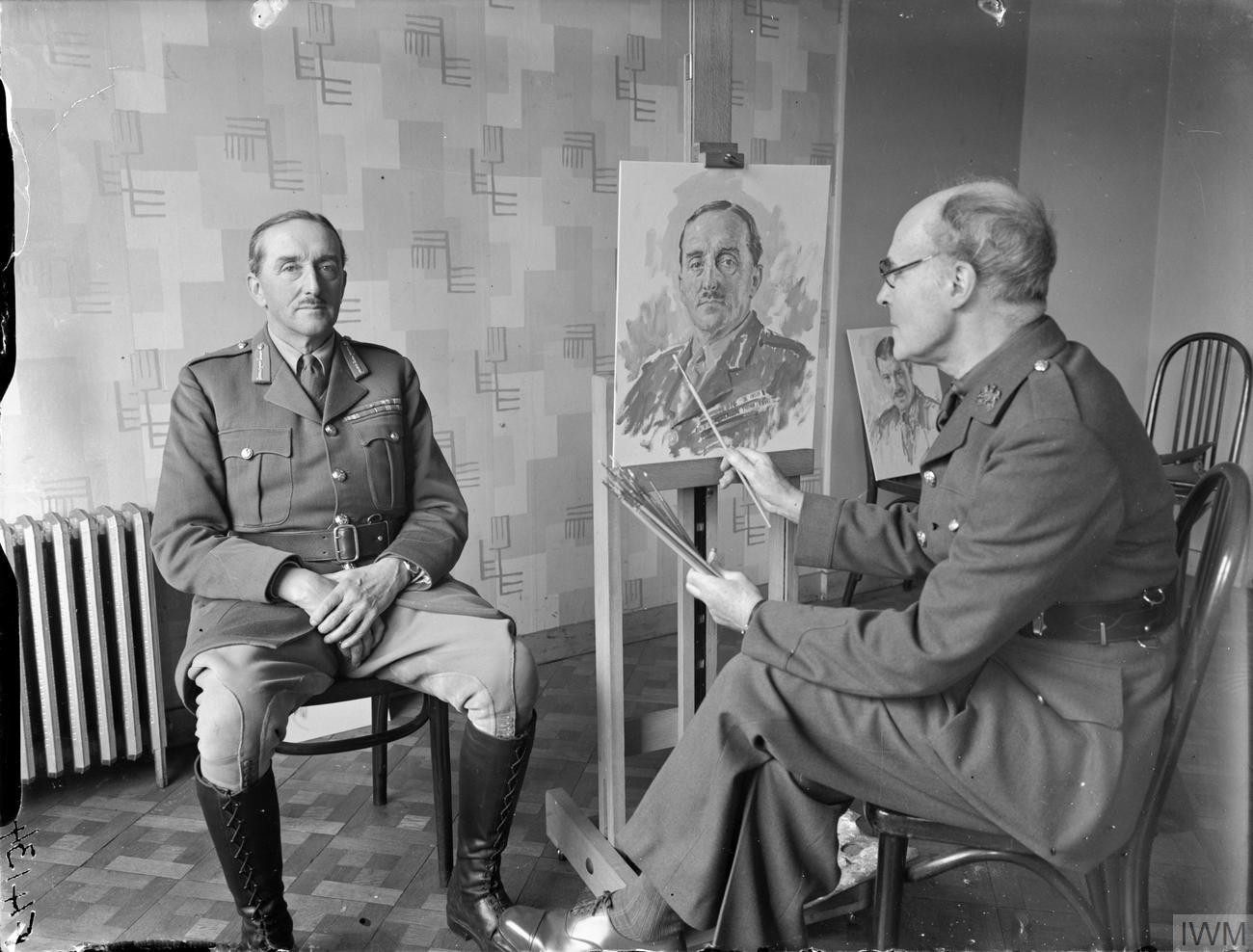
Lieutenant General Alan Brooke being painted by Eves, 30 April 1940.

When the Second World War broke out, Eves was among the first artists offered a full-time, salaried contract by the War Artists' Advisory Committee, WAAC, and along with Barnett Freedman, Edward Ardizzone and Edward Bawden, was sent to France in 1940 with the British Expeditionary Force, BEF. There, Eves mainly painted portraits while based at a hotel in Arras. After he returned to Britain in April 1940, Eves salaried contract was allowed to lapse, as it was difficult for high-ranking officers to make time for lengthy portrait settings; he was to paint Gort and all the (BEF) corps commanders. Lieutenant General Alan Brooke sat for him on 23 and 29 April and 27 October but his portrait was not completed. He said that Eves should be good as he charges £1500 for a picture in private life. However he continued to undertake individual commissions for WAAC.

Eves died on 13 June 1941. His works form part of the collections of both the Tate and the National Portrait Gallery.
