= Number Seventeen =

1932 film by Alfred Hitchcock

- Directed by: Alfred Hitchcock
- Screenplay by: Alfred Hitchcock; Alma Reville; Rodney Ackland
- Based on: Number Seventeen by Joseph Jefferson Farjeon
- Produced by: John Maxwell
- Starring: John Stuart; Anne Grey; Leon M. Lion; Donald Calthrop; Barry Jones; Ann Casson
- Cinematography: Jack Cox; Bryan Langley
- Edited by: A.C. Hammond
- Music by: Adolph Hallis
- Production company: Associated British Picture Corporation
- Distributed by: Wardour Films
- Release date: 18 July 1932 (London)
- Running time: 65 minutes
- Country: United Kingdom
- Language: English

Number Seventeen is a 1932 British comedy thriller film directed by Alfred Hitchcock and starring John Stuart, Anne Grey and Leon M. Lion. The film, which is based on the 1925 burlesque stage play Number Seventeen written by Joseph Jefferson Farjeon, concerns a group of criminals who commit a jewel robbery and hide their loot in an old house over a railway leading to the English Channel. The film's title is derived from the house's street number.

== Plot ==
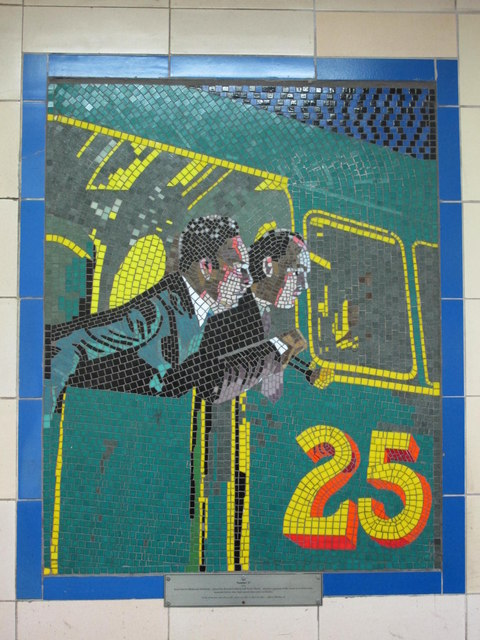
One of the tiled mosaics celebrating local boy Alfred Hitchcock in the subway at Leytonstone tube station.

Along a coastline in rural England, police Detective Barton arrives at a house, Number 17, marked for sale or rent. The door is unlocked, and he wanders in. An unknown person with a candle is wandering about and a dead body is found. When confronted, the mysterious person claims innocence of the murder. Barton, who introduces himself as Fordyce, asks the stranger about the contents of his pockets before the shadow of a hand is shown reaching for a doorknob. The stranger, who later introduces himself as Ben, a homeless derelict, searches the dead body and finds handcuffs and a pistol, which he takes.

The Detective returns from investigating weird sounds and finds the handcuffs that the stranger had left on the ground. A woman called Ms. Ackroyd is seen through shadows crawling on the roof. After falling through the roof, she is revived and cries out for her father. She explains that her father is on the roof and that they are next door in Number 15.

The bell tolls half past midnight, and the dead body has disappeared. Three people arrive at the windswept house: Brant, Nora (a deaf-mute woman) and a third person named Henry Doyle. Ben produces a pistol and accidentally shoots Barton/Fordyce in the arm. Brant produces a pistol of his own and asks Doyle to search Barton/Fordyce, Ben and Miss Rose Ackroyd. A telegram is revealed to Brant. A man named Sheldrake shows up and retrieves a diamond necklace, which he has hidden in the upper portion of a toilet. Ben causes a commotion and is locked away with Sheldrake in the toilet.

Sheldrake reaches out and appears to strangle Ben, who is only feigning unconsciousness. The supposed corpse turns out to be alive and pretends to be Sheldrake in order to fool the thieves. (He is, in fact, Rose's missing father, a police officer). Brant suggests binding Rose and Barton/Fordyce. Officer Ackroyd manages to lock away the three thieves and frees his daughter and Barton. He opens the door behind which Ben is locked away with Sheldrake and engages in a fistfight with Sheldrake.

Sheldrake wins the fistfight and frees Brant, Doyle, and Nora. Rose and Barton/Fordyce are bound again. Nora reveals that she is able to speak and says, "I'm coming back." She returns and frees Rose and Barton. Rose faints but recovers. Nora returns to the basement to allay the suspicions of the other thieves and to buy time for the rest to escape. They free Ben and Ackroyd. The thieves arrive at the railyard and board a departing freight train bound for the German States.

The train departs with Ben aboard and he stumbles onto crates of wine to consume. The thieves, after dispatching the conductor, walk to the front of the train, shoot the fireman and catch the driver as he faints. Barton, who failed to board the train before it departed, commandeers a bus and chases after the train. Ben is revealed to have the necklace. Sheldrake discovers this, and the thieves fight each other. Sheldrake claims that Doyle, is in fact, a detective posing as a thief. A chase scene occurs on the train as the thieves go after Doyle, who escapes and later handcuffs Nora. Barton’s bus races after the train. The thieves, realizing that the train is accelerating, try to find the brakes. They operate controls helplessly and notice Barton's/Fordyce's bus.

Despite the thieves' efforts, the train only accelerates, leaving them unable to escape. At the dock, the ferry arrives. As Barton watches, the train hurtles through the dock, crashes into the train on the ferry at full speed and pushes it out to sea, dragging the remaining cars into the ocean. People are rescued from the water. Possibly due to being drunk, Ben is among the last to get rescued.

Doyle tells Barton/Fordyce that he is Detective Barton. But "Fordyce”, who is the real Barton, reveals to Doyle that he's made a couple of mistakes. First, the cops weren't just after the necklace; they were also after Sheldrake. They knew that the necklace would draw Sheldrake out, and hence, that Sheldrake would surely draw Doyle out. Second, Doyle was foolish enough to impersonate a detective, and Barton, of all detectives... "The comic part of it is," Barton says, in conclusion, "I'm Barton." All of the thieves except Nora are apprehended by the police. In the final shot, Ben reveals to Nora and Barton that he has the diamond necklace.

== Cast ==
- Leon M. Lion as Ben
- Anne Grey as Nora – The 'Deaf-Mute' Girl
- John Stuart as Barton – The Detective
- Donald Calthrop as Brant – Nora's Escort
- Barry Jones as Henry Doyle
- Ann Casson as Rose Ackroyd
- Henry Caine as Officer Ackroyd
- Garry Marsh as Sheldrake

== Production ==
Hitchcock returned to England from a trip to the Caribbean with a new idea for a film. He told John Maxwell about it, but Maxwell said that Walter C. Mycroft had a different project for Hitchcock: a filmed version of Joseph Farjeon's play Number Seventeen, which had already been filmed. Hitchcock was unhappy with the project, as he considered the story to be riddled with cliches. He instead wished to film a version of John Van Druten's play London Wall. Director Thomas Bentley, who directed the 1932 film adaptation of London Wall titled After Office Hours, had wished to direct Number Seventeen.

Hitchcock was assigned writer Rodney Ackland for the film, which was intended as a comedy-oriented thriller.

Although the opening credits confirm the picture's title as Number Seventeen, much of the promotional material and many modern-day film databases refer to the film as Number 17, which was its American release title. In the 1966 book Hitchcock/Truffaut, Hitchcock called the film a "disaster."

The film makes extensive use of miniature sets, including a model train, bus and ferry.

This is one of the few Hitchcock thrillers that Hitchcock himself doesn't have a cameo in.

== Reception ==
Many critics who may be unfamiliar with the film's comedy origins have judged Number Seventeen as a failed attempt at serious drama. A reviewer for Variety wrote in August 1932: "Like the play, the story is vague and, despite its intended eeriness, unconvincing. It is asking a lot of an audience—even a picture one—to make them believe a woman accomplice of a band of thieves will fall in love at first sight with a detective and prevent his being done in by her associates." The review observed that the climactic train crash scene was "very good, but not sufficient to make it anything but a program feature."

Upon the film's initial release, some audience members reacted to Number Seventeen with confusion and disappointment. In the 1966 book Hitchcock/Truffaut, François Truffaut offered a similar verdict, telling Hitchcock that he had found the film "quite funny, but the story was rather confusing."

Number Seventeen continues to garner generally negative reviews; the critical consensus published by review aggregator Rotten Tomatoes calls the film "highly entertaining but practically incomprehensible" and an "unsatisfactory early tongue-in-cheek comedy/suspense yarn."

== Copyright status and home media ==
Number Seventeen is copyrighted worldwide, but it has been widely bootlegged on home video. However, various licensed, restored releases have appeared on DVD disc and video-on-demand services. On December 7, 2021, the film was released on Blu-ray disc in the U.S. by Kino Lorber.

== See also ==
- Number 17 (1928)
