= Clare Atwood =

British painter (1866–1962)

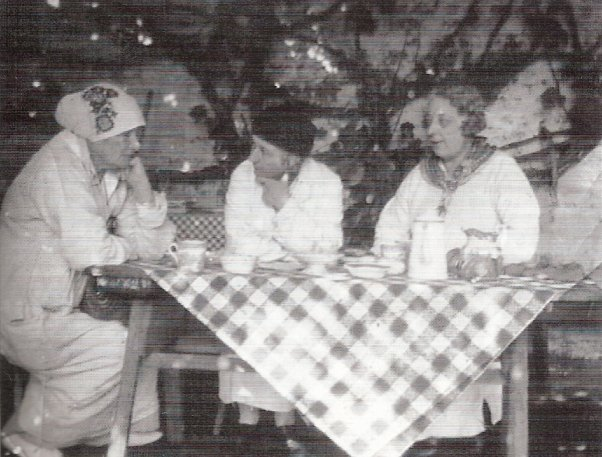
- Edith Craig, Clare Atwood and Christabel Marshall at Smallhythe Place, c. 1920
- Born: Clara Atwood; 11 May 1866; Richmond, England
- Died: 2 August 1962 (aged 96); Tenterden, Kent, England
- Resting place: St John the Baptist, Smallhythe, Kent
- Education: Westminster School of Art, Slade School of Art
- Occupation: Artist

Clare "Tony" Atwood (11 May 1866 – 2 August 1962) was a British painter of portraits, still life, landscapes, interiors and decorative flower subjects. Atwood lived in a ménage à trois with the dramatist Christabel Marshall and the actress, theatre director, producer and costume designer Edith Craig from 1916 until Craig's death in 1947.

== Early life ==
Atwood was born in 1866 at Richmond, London, the only daughter of Frederick Atwood, an architect, and his wife, Clara Becker. Named Clara at birth, she later used the form Clare and was also known as Tony. Atwood studied at Westminster School of Art and the Slade School of Fine Art.

Atwood first exhibited at the New English Art Club in 1893, becoming a member in 1912. She held an exhibition of her work at the Carfax Gallery in 1912. In 1917, during World War I, she was commissioned to paint war scenes for the Canadian Government through the Canadian War Memorials Fund. The Fund arranged for Atwood to visit the military camp at Folkestone in Kent to gather ideas for the work. However, Atwood decided instead to paint a scene at one of London's main railway stations where troops were waiting for trains to take them to camps or to the front. During the war, Atwood was also commissioned by the Women's Work Sub-committee of the Imperial War Museum to produce several pieces depicting the activities of the Women's Voluntary Service. The most notable of these, Christmas Day at the London Bridge YMCA Canteen, records the visit of the actress Ellen Terry and Princess Helena Victoria to a YMCA canteen. In 1920 she was commissioned for four more war paintings by the Imperial War Museum.

== Personal life ==
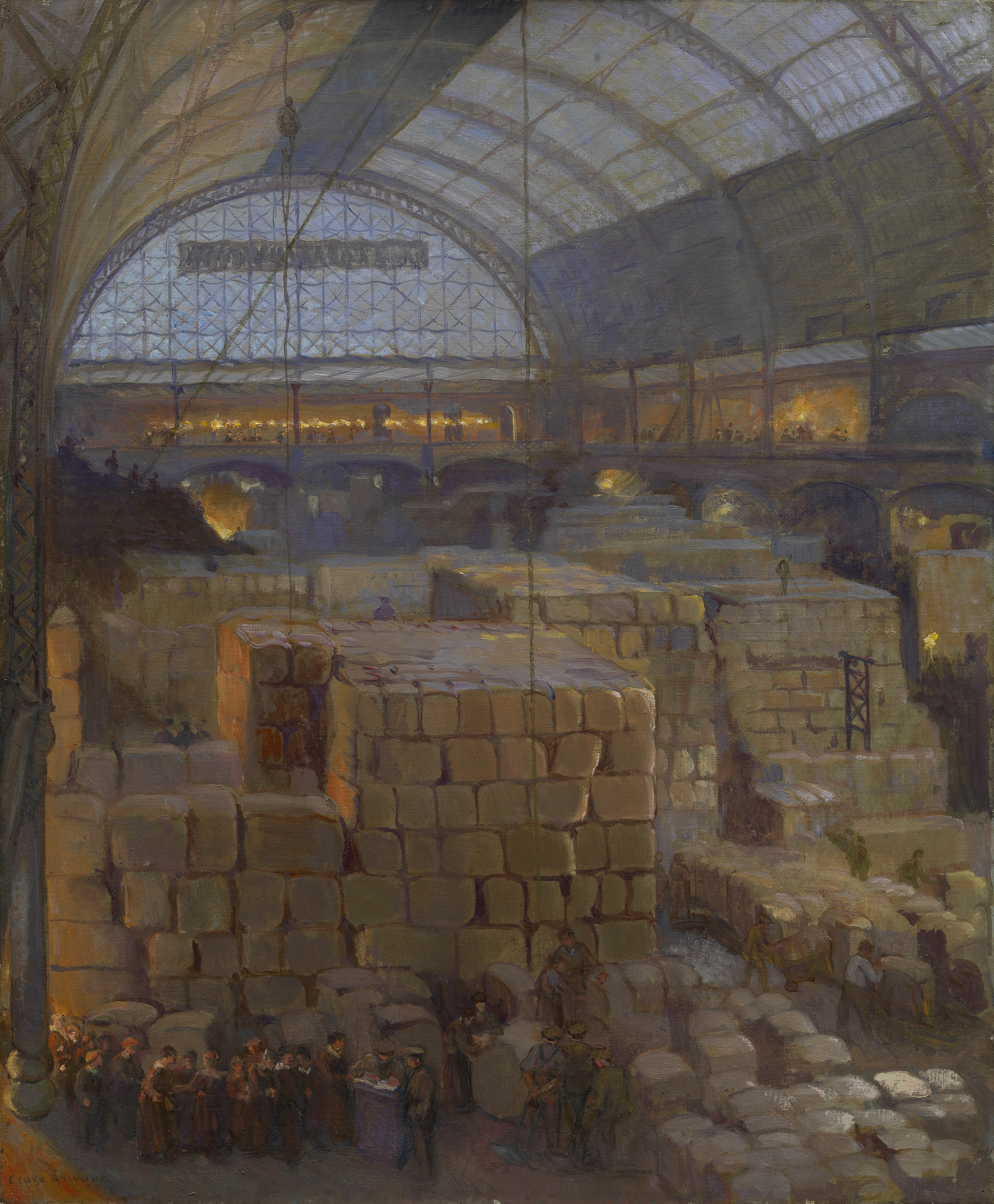
Olympia in War Time by Clare Atwood from the IWM collection.

A lesbian, from 1916 she lived with the writer Christabel Marshall and the actress and stage director Edith Craig in a ménage à trois at Tenterden in Kent until Craig's death in 1947, according to Michael Holroyd in his book A Strange Eventful History. The three were friends with lesbian novelist Radclyffe Hall, among other artists and writers. Atwood was a member of the Pioneer Players and designed props for several of Craig's productions with them, including the 16 foot high crucifix for their production of Paul Claudel's The Hostage. Atwood occasionally performed at the Barn Theatre at Smallhythe Place in Kent, founded by Craig in memory of her late mother, the actress Ellen Terry. Atwood acted in the matinée at the Palace Theatre, London on 23 April 1929, held to raise funds for the Ellen Terry Memorial. In 1932, Atwood decorated the shoe for Craig's production of The Shoe in Tenterden. After Craig's death, Atwood wrote an essay about her. The relationship is portrayed in the play Grace Pervades by David Hare, which premiered in the West End in 2026.

== Death ==
Atwood suffered a fractured femur, senile myocarditis and heart failure, and died at Kench Hill Nursing Home, Tenterden, Kent, on 2 August 1962. Marshall and Atwood are buried alongside each other at St John the Baptist's Church, Small Hythe. Craig's ashes were supposed to be buried there as well, but at the time of Marshall and Atwood's deaths, the ashes got lost and a memorial was placed in the cemetery instead.

== Collections ==
Atwood's paintings are held in collections Tate Collection, the V&A and Imperial War Museum, Fenton House in London, as well as in the Victoria Art Gallery, Bath, Glasgow, Manchester and Liverpool. She exhibited at the Royal Academy, and in 1940 one of her paintings was purchased by the National Art Gallery of New Zealand.

There is material relating to Atwood held in the Ellen Terry Collection at the V&A Department of Theatre & Performance Archive.
