= Christabel Marshall =

English author and suffragist (1871–1960)

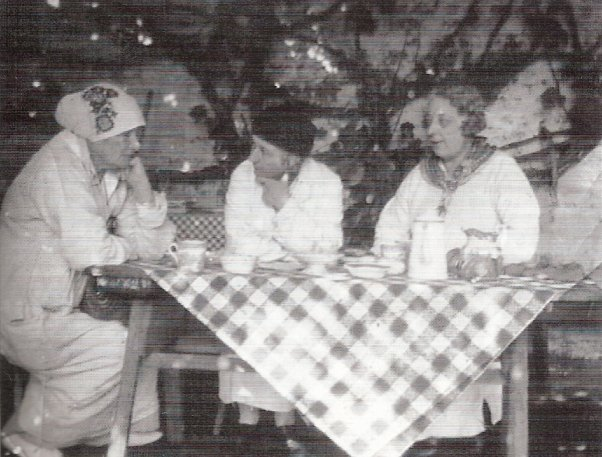
- Edith Craig, Clare Atwood and Christabel Marshall at Smallhythe Place
- Born: 24 October 1871; Exeter, Devon, England
- Died: 20 October 1960 (aged 88); Tenterden, Kent, England
- Resting place: St John the Baptist, Smallhythe, Kent, England
- Other name: Joanna Willett
- Education: Somerville College, University of Oxford
- Occupations: playwright, author and suffragist
- Organization(s): Women's Social and Political Union, Women Writers' Suffrage League, Actresses' Franchise League

Christabel Gertrude Marshall (a.k.a. Christopher Marie St John) (24 October 1871 – 20 October 1960) was an English campaigner for women's suffrage, a playwright and author. Marshall lived in a ménage à trois with the artist Clare Atwood and the actress, director and theatrical designer Edith Craig from 1916 until Craig's death in 1947.

== Family and education ==
Born in Exeter, she was the youngest of nine children of Emma Marshall, née Martin (1828–1899), novelist, and Hugh Graham Marshall (c.1825–1899), manager of the West of England Bank. She changed her name on her conversion to Catholicism in adulthood.

Having taken a BA in Modern History at Somerville College, Oxford, Marshall became the secretary to Mrs Humphry Ward, Lady Randolph Churchill and, occasionally, to her son Winston Churchill.

== Career and relationships ==
In pursuit of becoming a dramatist, Marshall went on the stage for three years to learn stagecraft, briefly using the stage name Joanna Willett in 1903. She lived with the designer and director Edith Craig from 1899 to Craig's death in 1947 first at Smith Square, then Covent Garden, and later Tenterden, Kent. Their relationship became temporarily strained when Craig received, and accepted, a marriage proposal from the composer Martin Shaw in 1903, and Marshall attempted suicide. She occasionally worked as secretary to the actress Ellen Terry and travelled to America with Terry in 1907.

In 1916, Marshall and Craig were joined by the artist Clare 'Tony' Atwood, living in a ménage à trois until Craig died in 1947. In 1900, Marshall published her first novel, The Crimson Weed, which takes its title from a transformation of the traditional symbol of the red rose. A feminist, in 1909 she joined the Women's Social and Political Union (WSPU), having previously worked for the Women Writers' Suffrage League and the Actresses' Franchise League.

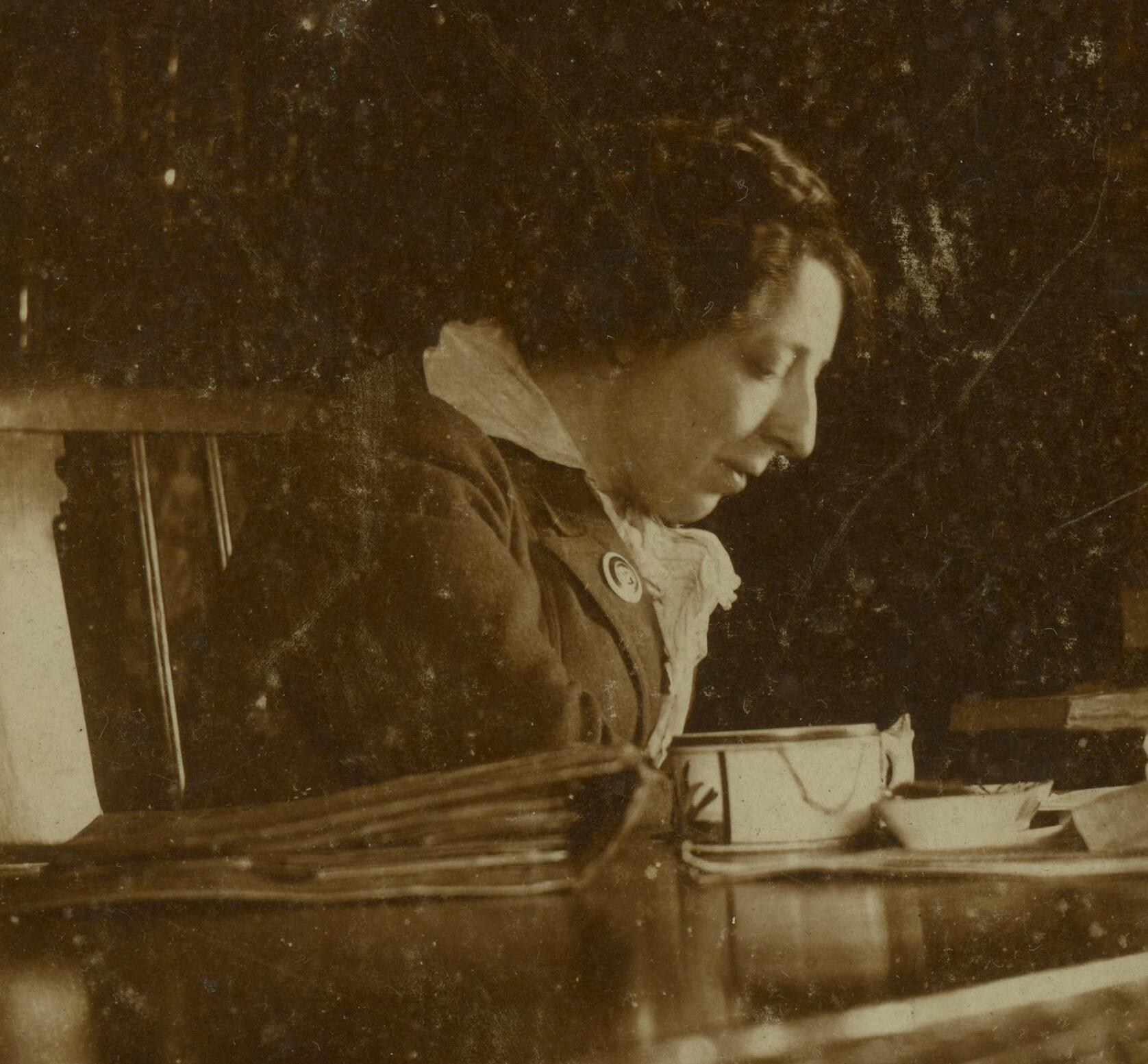
Christopher St. John

In 1909, Marshall turned her friend Cicely Hamilton's short story How The Vote Was Won into a play, and it became popular with women's suffrage groups throughout the United Kingdom and a "box office triumph." Also in 1909, Marshall joined a WSPU deputation to the House of Commons of the United Kingdom, contributing an article Why I Went on the Deputation to the journal Votes for Women in July 1909. In November 1909, Marshall appeared as the woman-soldier Hannah Snell in Hamilton's Pageant of Great Women, directed by Craig. With Hamilton she also wrote The Pot and the Kettle (1909), and with Charles Thursby, The Coronation (1912). In May 1911 her play The First Actress was one of the three plays in the first production of Craig's theatre society, the Pioneer Players. Marshall's plays Macrena and On the East Side were produced by the Pioneer Players, as well as her translation (with Marie Potapenko) of The Theatre of the Soul by Nikolai Evreinov.

Marshall converted to ascetic Catholicism in 1912, in Rome, and took the name St John. She joined the Catholic Women's Suffrage Society, later known as the St. Joan's International Alliance, in 1913. She was arrested for taking part in a deputation to the House of Commons and for setting fire to a letter box.

St John, Craig and Atwood were friends with many artists and writers including lesbian novelist Radclyffe Hall, who lived nearby in Rye. As Christopher St John in 1915, she published her autobiographical novel Hungerheart, which she had started in 1899, and which she based on her relationship with Craig and her own involvement in the women's suffrage movement. It had the subtitle story of the soul and explored her sexuality and spiritualism. St John was also contracted by Terry to assist on various publications. After Terry's death in 1928, St John published the Shaw–Terry Correspondence (1931) and Terry's Four Lectures on Shakespeare (1932). St John and Craig revised and edited Terry's Memoirs (1933). After Craig's death in 1947, St John and Atwood helped to keep the Ellen Terry Memorial Museum in operation. Some of St John's papers have survived in the National Trust's Ellen Terry and Edith Craig Archive.

Her relationship with Craig and Atwood is portrayed in the play Grace Pervades by David Hare, which premiered in the West End in 2026.

== Death ==
Marshall died from pneumonia connected with heart disease at Tenterden in 1960. Marshall and Atwood are buried alongside each other at St John the Baptist's Church, Small Hythe. Craig's ashes were supposed to be buried there as well, but at the time of Marshall and Atwood's deaths, the ashes were lost and a memorial was placed in the cemetery instead.
