= Edith Craig =

British actress, theatre director and suffragette (1869–1947)

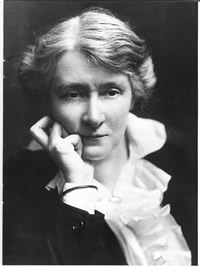
Edith Craig

Edith Ailsa Geraldine Craig (9 December 1869 – 27 March 1947) was a British theatre director, producer, costume designer and early pioneer of the women's suffrage movement in England. She was the daughter of the actress Ellen Terry and the progressive English architect-designer Edward William Godwin, and the sister of theatre practitioner Edward Gordon Craig.

As a lesbian, a campaigner for women's suffrage, and a woman working as a theatre director and producer, Craig has been studied by feminist scholars as well as theatre historians. Craig lived in a ménage à trois with the dramatist Christabel Marshall and the artist Clare "Tony" Atwood from 1916 until her death.

== Early years ==
Craig, nicknamed Edy, was born in 1869 at Gustardwood common in Hertfordshire. Her mother, Ellen Terry, was still married to George Frederic Watts when she left him to live with Edward William Godwin, in 1868. The family later lived in Fallows Green, Harpenden in Hertfordshire, a house designed by Godwin, until Terry left Godwin in 1875. In 1877 Terry married her second husband, Charles Clavering Wardell, an actor with the stage name Charles Kelly. Wardell was a kind stepfather, and Edith liked him very much, but he had a drinking problem. During the marriage, the children took the name Wardell. Terry and Wardell separated in 1881. Edith and her brother Edward changed their surname to Craig, partly to avoid the stigma of their illegitimate birth, after admiring Ailsa Craig, an island off the coast of Scotland, while there on holiday. She legally changed her name, and was baptised, Edith Ailsa Geraldine Craig (Geraldine after her godmother, Mrs Stephen Coleridge) in 1888.

Craig was educated at Mrs Cole's school, a co-educational institution in Earls Court in London, and later studied at Dixton Manor in Winchcombe, Gloucestershire, under Elizabeth Malleson, who introduced her to the suffrage movement. She later attended the Royal Academy of Music and obtained a certificate in piano from Trinity College London. She trained as a pianist under Alexis Hollander in Berlin, Germany, from 1887 to 1890, but severe arthritis in her hands prevented Craig from pursuing a professional music career.

== Theatre career ==
Ellen Terry and Craig onstage at the Lyceum Theatre, c. 1895

Craig made her first appearance on the stage in 1878 during the run of Olivia at the Royal Court Theatre, in which her mother starred. She trained as a pianist under Alexis Hollander in Berlin, Germany, from 1887 to 1890. She later joined Henry Irving's Lyceum Theatre company in 1887 as a costume designer and actress, touring America in 1895 and 1907 under the stage name Ailsa Craig. She appeared with Henry Irving in a number of plays at the Lyceum, including The Bells (1895). In 1895 her performances in Pinero's Bygones and Charles Reade's The Lyons Mail were praised, respectively, by George Bernard Shaw and Eleonora Duse. Shaw was a family friend and wrote several roles specifically for her. In his play Candida, it is believed that the role of Prossy was created for Craig, who originally played the role. Craig also acted in plays by Henrik Ibsen, and toured with Mrs Brown-Potter and the Independent Theatre. Craig shifted her focus to stagecraft and theatre production as she eventually lost interest in acting.

During the 1890s she became increasingly involved in managing Ellen Terry's theatrical career and gained recognition for her historically accurate costumes. In addition to her costume work, during the 1890s, she began to take over managing her mother’s career. In 1899, Irving employed her to make the costumes for his production of Robespierre, which led to her going into business as a dressmaker as Edith Craig & Co, in Covent Garden, until 1903. After Terry left the Lyceum, Craig accompanied her on her tours in the English provinces and America as her stage-director, and from then play-production became her chief occupation.

In 1911 Craig founded the Pioneer Players, a theatre society based in London until 1925. The Pioneer Players staged formerly banned plays and plays addressing social reform, women's suffrage and feminist issues, and introduced English audiences to translated European drama. The plays in translation allowed the group to reach beyond the Actresses Franchise League and to be accepted into mainstream English theatre. Craig served as managing director and stage director, while Christabel Marshall served as secretary. Ellen Terry was the society's president, and the advisory committee included George Bernard Shaw and Gabrielle Enthoven. The Pioneer Players staged approximately 150 productions and played a role in expanding opportunities for women in theatre production.

== Suffrage activism ==
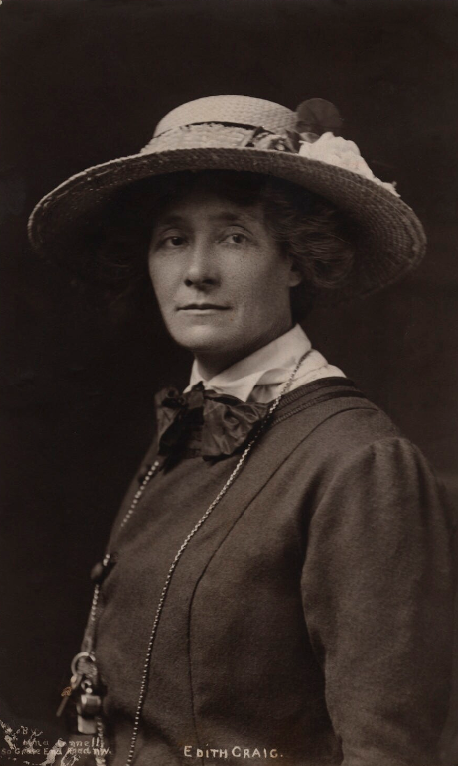
Craig in the 1910s

Craig was actively involved in the women's suffrage movement, participating in the Actresses' Franchise League and the Women's Freedom League. and using theatre as a form of political activism. One of her best-known productions was A Pageant of Great Women (1909), created with Cicely Hamilton. It followed the concept of a morality play in which the main character, Woman, is confronted by the antagonist, Prejudice, who believes that men and women are not equal. Justice presides over the debate between Prejudice and Woman, as groups of great women process on stage as evidence of women's achievements in art, government, education, spiritual matters and battle. Craig directed each production of A Pageant and frequently performed the role of the French painter Rosa Bonheur.

== Later theatre work ==
After the Pioneer Players closed in 1925, Craig worked with the British Little Theatre movement and directed productions in York, Leeds, Letchworth and Hampstead. In 1919 she helped establish the British Drama League, an organization created to promote amateur theatre throughout Britain. In 1929, following the death of her mother, Craig converted an Elizabethan barn at Smallhythe Place into The Barn Theatre, where she staged annual productions of Shakespeare in memory of Terry. Craig also appeared in several silent films including Fires of Fate (1923).

== Personal life and death ==
Early in life, Craig had two heterosexual relationships. The composer Martin Shaw proposed to Craig in 1903, and she accepted. However, the marriage was prevented by Terry and by Christabel Marshall, who wrote under the pseudonym Christopher St. John with whom Craig lived from 1899 until they were joined in 1916 by the artist Clare "Tony" Atwood, living in a ménage à trois until Craig's death in 1947. Her lesbianism was not supported by her family. Craig became involved in several books about her mother and Shaw, which created a rift in her relationship with her brother, who asked Craig not to write about their mother, and specifically not to share the details of the family's innermost problems. Edward's book Ellen Terry and her Secret Self (1931) explicitly objected to Ellen Terry and Bernard Shaw: a Correspondence (1931) edited by Christopher St. John. In 1932 Craig co-edited with St. John Ellen Terry's Memoirs in which she replied to her brother's representation of their mother. Also in 1932 Craig adopted Ruby Chelta Craig. Craig was reconciled with her brother some time before her death.

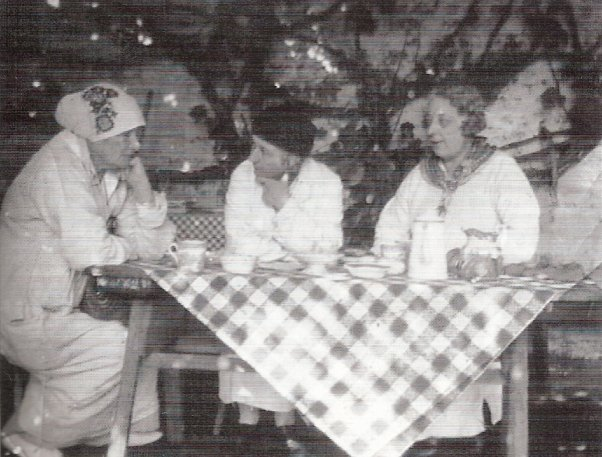
Edith Craig, Clare Atwood and Christabel Marshall at Smallhythe Place

On the death of her mother Craig committed her life to preserving her mother's legacy. She opened the family home at Smallhythe Place in Kent, England, to the public as a museum devoted to Terry's life and theatrical career. From 1939 she was supported in running the house by the National Trust.

Craig died of coronary thrombosis and chronic myocarditis on 27 March 1947 at Smallhythe Place while planning a Shakespeare festival in honor of her mother. On her death she left Smallhythe Place to the National Trust as a memorial to her mother. Her body was cremated. Marshall and Atwood are buried alongside each other at St John the Baptist's Church, Small Hythe. Craig's ashes were supposed to be buried there as well, but at the time of Marshall and Atwood's deaths the ashes got lost, and a memorial was placed in the cemetery instead.

== Legacy ==
Craig is regarded as one of the earliest professional female stage directors in Britain and a major figure in feminist theatre history. After the death of her mother, Craig dictated her memoirs to her friend Vera Holme, known as Jacko. Holme wrote them down in a quarto notebook that was "lost in an attic" for decades and then sold to Ann Rachlin in 1978. They included Craig's reminiscences of her childhood and life with her mother, brother and Henry Irving. Rachlin published them in her book Edy was a Lady in 2011.

Virginia Woolf is said to have used Edith Craig as a model for the character of Miss LaTrobe in her novel Between the Acts (1941). David Hare's play Grace Pervades, explores the lives of Irving, Terry and her children. It premiered in 2025 at Theatre Royal, Bath, transferring in 2026 to the Theatre Royal, Haymarket.

== Selected filmography ==
- Her Greatest Performance (1916)
- God and the Man (1918)
- Victory and Peace (1918)
- The God in the Garden (1921)
- Fires of Fate (1923)
- The Desert Sheik (1924)
- Harmony Lane (1935)
- Behind the Headlines (1937)

== Sources ==
- Booth, Michael R. "Terry, Dame Ellen Alice (1847–1928)", ''Oxford Dictionary of National Biography''.
- Cockin, Katharine (1998). Edith Craig (1869–1947): Dramatic Lives. London: Cassell. ISBN 0304336459.
- Cockin, Katharine (2001). Women and Theatre in the Age of Suffrage: The Pioneer Players 1911–25, Palgrave.
- Cockin, Katharine (2005). "Cicely Hamilton's Warriors: Dramatic Reinventions of Militancy in the British Women's Suffrage Movement", Women's History Review, Vol. 14, Nos. 3 & 4.
- Law, Cheryl. ''Suffrage and Power: the Women's Movement, 1918–1928''. I.B. Tauris, 1997.
- Gandolfi, Roberta (2003). La prima regista: Edith Craig, Roma: Bulzone Editore.
- Holroyd, Michael (2008). A Strange Eventful History: The Dramatic Lives of Ellen Terry, Henry Irving and Their Remarkable Families, London: Chatto & Windus ISBN 9780701179878
- Rachlin, Ann (2011). Edy Was a Lady, Leicester: Matador.
- Rudd, Jill & Val Gough (eds.). ''Charlotte Perkins Gilman: Optimist Reformer''. University of Iowa Press, 1999.
- Shearer, Moira (1999). Ellen Terry. Phoenix Mill: Sutton Publishing. ISBN 0-7509-1526-9.
- "Edith Craig", Collaborative Organization for Virtual Education (COVE).
- "The Orlando Project of Women Writers".
- "Ellen Terry and Edith Craig Database".
- 'Who's Who in the Theatre'', 8th ed., 1936, ed. John Parker.

== See also ==
- Terry family
