= Gabrielle Enthoven =

English playwright (1868–1950)

Gabrielle Enthoven OBE
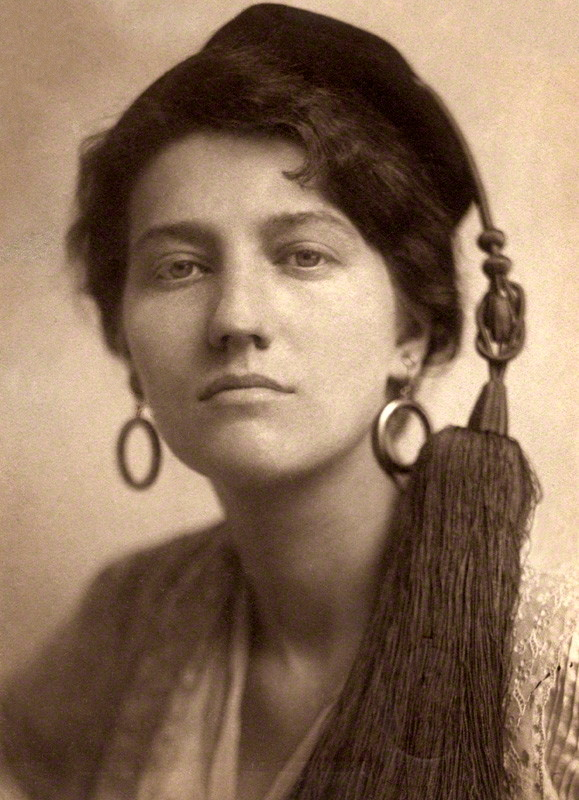
- Enthoven in 1904, photograph by George Charles Beresford
- Born: Augusta Gabrielle Eden Romaine; 12 January 1868; Westminster, London, UK
- Died: 18 August 1950 (aged 82); Cadogan Gardens, London, UK
- Occupations: Theatre archivist and collector; playwright
- Organizations: Pioneer Players; Red Cross
- Known for: theatrical collection

Gabrielle Enthoven OBE (born Augusta Gabrielle Eden Romaine, 12 January 1868 – 18 August 1950) was an English playwright, amateur actress, theatre archivist, and prolific collector of theatrical ephemera relating to the London stage. In 1911, Enthoven began campaigning for the establishment of a theatrical section in one of the British museums. In 1924, the Victoria and Albert Museum accepted her private collection, at this time containing over 80,000 theatrical playbills and programmes. The material became the founding collection of the museum's theatre and performance archives. Enthoven's unparalleled knowledge of the London stage and its history earned her the sobriquet "the theatrical encyclopaedia".

== Early life ==
Gabrielle Enthoven was born at 21 New Street, Spring Gardens, Westminster, London to William Govett Romaine (1815–1893) and Frances Pheobe Romaine, née Tennant (1822/3-1909). Enthoven's year of birth was incorrectly listed in the family Bible as 1870, a fact which Enthoven did not discover until her sixtieth birthday. On finding this out, Enthoven remarked: "Such a shock darling. I was giving a lovely party and John Gielgud and everybody was coming, and suddenly I discovered that I was not sixty at all, but sixty-two. Wasn't it awful?"

Her father was Judge Advocate General in the Crimea and India, Legal Advisor to the Board of Admiralty, and Minister in Egypt. Much of Enthoven's childhood was spent abroad as she accompanied her father on trips to various postings in both India and the Middle East. In Egypt, Enthoven used to ride in her own carriage during state occasions and rode in the desert with Charles George Gordon On her father's retirement in 1879, the family returned to England, settling in a house named "The Old Priory" just outside Windsor, Berkshire where Enthoven lived until her father's death in 1893. Enthoven had never been educated at school, nor had she been tutored by a governess. As a result, she was fifteen years old before she could neither read or write. She could, however, as a result of her travels abroad, speak fluent Egyptian Arabic, Turkish, two Hindustani dialects, French, Italian, Spanish, and some German.

There were occasions when a carriage was sent from nearby Windsor Castle to collect Enthoven and her friends to play with the young Princess Mary of Teck, later to become Queen Mary. Enthoven recalled slapping the young princess across the face on one occasion, an incident which the two women would recall in later years when the Queen visited Enthoven at the Victoria and Albert Museum.

Enthoven was a small child when she first visited the theatre. She climbed out of her bedroom window clutching a shilling and made the journey to the Gaiety Theatre, London to see a production of The Forty Thieves. Climbing beneath the legs of the waiting crowd, Enthoven was picked up by a large navvy who placed her upon his shoulders and pushed his way through the throng of people to find them a seat on the front row of the gallery. Half-way through the performance, he took out an orange from his pocket, bit into it, pushed some sugar in the hole with his thumb, and gave it to Enthoven to suck.

== Personal life ==
In 1893, Enthoven married Major Charles Henfrey Enthoven (1866–1910), who at various times occupied the role of Staff Captain in the Royal Engineers, General Staff Officer at the War Office, and Chief Officer of London County Council's Parks Department. The couple had no children. Charles Enthoven died of pneumonia on 30 April 1910. Enthoven was not reported as being present at her husband's funeral.

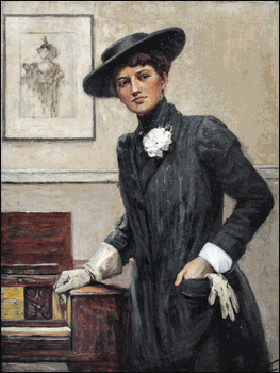
Gabrielle Enthoven by the suffragist Ethel Wright c. 1910

Enthoven was a recognised and well-known figure within London's theatrical society. She was an inveterate first-nighter and had friendships with many members of the theatrical elite including John Gielgud, Peggy Ashcroft, Marda Vanne, Edward Gordon Craig, Edith Craig and Noël Coward. In 1921, Enthoven was staying in New York with Cecile Sartoris, with whom she had translated The Honeysuckle, a play by the Italian writer Gabriele D'Annunzio. The play was performed that year at the Lyceum Theatre. Noël Coward stayed with Enthoven and Sartoris during this period. Recalling his stay with the two women, he wrote: "they said that when I sold a play, or made some money somehow, I could pay rent, but until then I was to be their guest […] I accepted and moved in immediately, grateful not only for their kindness, but for their company." During Enthoven's stay in New York, in a flat on Washington Square South, she spent time with many influential people within artistic and theatrical society. The American poet and playwright Mercedes de Acosta wrote about Enthoven's stay in New York in her 1960s memoir Here Lies the Heart]. She described Enthoven as being "a woman of rare culture, of heart, and remarkable intelligence. A woman, too, of great humour. There were few like her."

Enthoven knew Oscar Wilde very well and would visit him at his home as a young girl. After these visits she would return home and copy down the stories he had told her. In 1948, Enthoven presented the British Library with a pamphlet containing four prose poems of Wilde's that she had had printed and bound under the title Echoes. In 1889, Wilde dedicated a poem to Enthoven entitled Remorse. (a study in saffron).

It is possible that Enthoven engaged in lesbian relationships after the death of her husband. She was a central member of London's lesbian haut monde. This group included women such as the writer Radclyffe Hall, best known for writing the banned lesbian classic The Well of Loneliness, the sculptor Una Troubridge, the painter Romaine Brooks, and the tennis player and fencer Toupie Lowther. The group referred to themselves as 'The Circle' and would regularly meet to have dinner parties at their homes in the exclusive London borough of Kensington and Chelsea, visit the theatre, or dance at clubs in Soho such as the "Cave of Harmony" and "The Orange Tree". The women lived a privileged lifestyle of grand houses, villas in the sun, inherited incomes, successful careers, and stylish lovers. In the 1930s, however, Enthoven was dropped by her friends Radclyffe Hall and Una Troubridge, with Troubridge accusing Enthoven of "repudiating her own kind when opportune to do so", and adding "she's a rat and we have no use for her". Enthoven had played the leading role in a production of Colette's novel Chéri which had been adapted by Troubridge. The play was an unequivocal failure, and this may have contributed to the demise of the women's friendship.

In 1923, Enthoven was instrumental in bringing the Italian actress Eleonora Duse over to England for her farewell engagement.

== Theatrical activities ==
Enthoven was a keen playwright and had her first play, Montmartre, produced at the Alhambra Theatre, London in 1912 as part of a revue called Kill That Fly!. The Observer gave a favourable review of the sketch, writing: "the little wordless thrill, 'Montmartre', by Gabrielle Enthoven, is the most thrilling thing of its kind we have seen". She was the president and founding member, alongside her close friends Edith Craig and Christopher St John, of the Pioneer Players, a London-based theatre society founded in 1911. The company was formed from members of the Actresses' Franchise League. The Pioneer Players engaged heavily with socio-political issues of the era. The society "acknowledged an interest in women's suffrage and in any other current movement of interest". In 1916, the company produced the play Ellen Young, written by Enthoven and Edmund Goulding. It was performed at the Savoy Theatre on 2 April 1916.

In 1921, Enthoven and Cecile Sartoris's translation of Gabriele D'Annunzio's The Honeysuckle played at the Lyceum Theatre (Broadway) in New York, as well as at "Playroom 6" in Soho, London on 9 May 1927. In 1930, The Confederates, a play written by Enthoven in collaboration with H. M. Harwood was produced at the Ambassadors Theatre. Enthoven was an enthusiastic amateur actress and appeared with the "Windsor Strollers", the "Old Stagers" and other prominent amateur companies. The Belgian playwright Maurice Maeterlinck asked Enthoven to appear in Paris in a production of his play Pelléas and Mélisande, although she never did. Sarah Bernhardt and Mrs Patrick Campbell eventually performed together in this play after being introduced to one another by Enthoven. Enthoven was a councillor of the Stage Society and, in 1933, the vice-president of the newly formed "Passing Theatres Association", a society with the aim to collect records and visit sites of old theatres. Shortly before her death in 1950, Enthoven became the first Chairman of the Society for Theatre Research.

== Theatre collection ==
After her marriage in 1893, Enthoven began to regularly attend the theatre and to paste various press cuttings relating to the London theatre into scrapbooks. Her great interest in theatre and theatre history led Enthoven to start collecting memorabilia and ephemera related to the stage. She recalled: "It started when, in 1900, I noticed an inaccuracy in some book of stage history. Being passionately interested in the theatre, I wrote to the author who admitted a mistake. There the matter might have stopped; but soon afterwards I happened to find some old playbills that proved my point. That was when the 'collecting' flea bit me." A chance purchase of two-hundred playbills became the foundation of Enthoven's vast collection, and, after her husband's death in 1910, Enthoven's collecting increased.

In 1911, Enthoven mounted a national campaign to establish a permanent theatre collection in a British institution. Writing to The Observer she advocated for:

A comprehensive theatrical section in an existing museum to comprise specimens of all the different branches necessary to the working of a play from the construction of the theatre, the designing of the scenery and costumes to the smallest workings necessary in the house. Also a library and collection of playbills, prints, pictures and relics, etc. I want the section to be the place where the producer, actor, author and critic will naturally go for information, both of what is being done in this and other countries at present and what has been done before.

National theatre collections had been established in America at the Harvard Library, in Rome, Milan, Stockholm and Paris, but not in England. The British Museum contained a valuable collection of 600,000 playbills from across Britain and abroad. This collection was, however, considered incomplete.

Enthoven's campaign continued to gain momentum with numerous letters and comments of support appearing in the national press. Enthoven's connections with well-known and celebrated members of theatrical society contributed to the success of the campaign, with people such as Sir Herbert Beerbohm Tree, Sir George Alexander, and Sir John Hare publicly declaring their support. In November 1911, it was announced that the London Museum was to devote a section to a permanent exhibition of theatrical objects that would chart the developments and phases of theatre both in Britain and abroad. It was to be the first time that a British museum had a recognised theatrical section. The project was overseen by Guy Francis Laking, the keeper of the London Museum. Enthoven's vast collection of playbills would remain at her home, but she asked the public to lend or give any theatrical objects they possessed to the museum to ensure the exhibition's success. The exhibition was, however, unsuccessful. A visitor to the museum wrote to the Pall Mall Gazette to declare that "those looking for enlightenment must go away sadly baffled, and those who, having a regard for the sentiment and charm of what such a collection should be, must blush indeed as they see this scanty, mediocre, and careless assortment." A lacklustre response from the public and a lack of space at the museum were blamed for the exhibition's poor reception.

Undeterred, Enthoven continued to write to museums to establish a permanent theatrical section. Her first choice of a home for her collection and theatrical section was the Victoria and Albert Museum. However, she continued to face difficulties and received a letter from the museum stating that "there is so little chance of your scheme being adopted that we should scarcely be justified in asking you to come here, as you suggest, to discuss it." In 1922, the Victoria and Albert Museum held the International Theatre Exhibition: Designs and Models for the Modern Stage and displayed a number of items from Enthoven's enormous collection. This gave Enthoven the motivation to continue her campaign.

In the 1920s, Enthoven's collection had increased to such an extent that it could no longer remain in her home. In 1924, after more than a decade of campaigning, the Victoria and Albert Museum finally agreed to house her collection, at this time containing more than 80,000 playbills, prints, books and engravings. The collection was named the Gabrielle Enthoven Theatrical Collection. The playbills were housed in the Department of Engraving, Illustration and Design. In 1925, Enthoven and three members of staff arrived at the museum to begin to catalogue, index and arrange the collection. Enthoven received no payment for her work and paid the wages of her staff from her own funds. An appeal for financial aid to contribute to the cataloguing of the collection was launched in the national press, with theatrical personalities such as Sybil Thorndike supporting the campaign. After the Second World War, the government provided Enthoven with two paid assistants, though she herself never received a salary.

Enthoven had substantial offers from American institutions to purchase her collection. She was once offered £9,000 by an American collector but refused and upon her death it became known that she had once turned down an American offer of £30,000. The collection was to remain in England. Enthoven continued to add to the collection up until her death. At the age of 81, the "Grand Old Lady of London theatre first-nighters" still arrived at the Victoria and Albert Museum at 10 o'clock every morning to sort and index her playbills.

== First and Second World Wars ==
During the First World War Enthoven was one of the first eleven people to join the War Refugee Committee and became the head of the Correspondence and Indexing Department. In 1915 she began to work for the Red Cross in dealing with missing soldiers and prisoners of war and, in 1916, she eventually became head of the Records Department of the Central Prisoners of War and Missing Persons Committee dealing with the welfare of British prisoners of war in Germany, Russia and Turkey. This work ceased in 1920 owing to Enthoven's ill health. In 1921, Enthoven visited New York as a Red Cross representative to raise funds to build schools for children in devastated areas of France. Enthoven was awarded an OBE in recognition of this work. Radclyffe Hall was said to be "frankly envious" about Enthoven's activities during the war and the subsequent recognition of her endeavours. Hall had attended Red Cross lectures, learnt first-aid, and transported library books to casualty wards but felt this was not as heroic as the work undertaken by Enthoven.

On the outbreak of the Second World War, Enthoven suspended her work at the Victoria and Albert Museum and returned to the War Office to work as the head of the Records Department of the Central Prisoners of War. Enthoven, in one of her scrapbooks at the museum, wrote: "Work ceased here on declaration of War Sep. 3 1939. I started work here alone on 13 August 1945."

== Death ==
Enthoven died at her home in Cadogan Gardens, London aged 82 on 18 August 1950. An obituary appeared in both The Times and The New York Times. Before her death Enthoven confirmed:

I desire that my body shall be cremated without the celebration of any funeral service in the cheapest possible manner as my Trustees shall decide [and] that my ashes shall be scattered and I desire that none of my friends shall attend my funeral nor wear mourning for me of any kind and they shall be requested not to send any flowers.

Enthoven bequeathed the residue of her estate to the Ministry of Education who, at the time, were responsible for the Victoria and Albert Museum's finances. The bequest states that Enthoven's money would be used to ensure that "proper accommodation for the Gabrielle Enthoven Theatrical collection continues to be provided and for the cataloguing, maintenance arrangement, and description of the Playbills, Prints, Printed Tickets, and other material".

== See also ==
- Theatre Museum
