= Robert Brigandyne =

Administrator of the navy in England

Robert Brigandyne, Brygandyne or Brickenden, (c. 1465 – c. 1525) was an English shipwright and administrator who held the position of Clerk of the King's Ships during the reigns of English kings Henry VII and Henry VIII. He supervised the construction of several warships in his home town of Smallhythe in Kent and at the royal dockyard, Portsmouth. At Portsmouth he built England's first dry dock.

== Early life ==
No record has been found to identify Brigandyne's date or place of birth, but he came from an established family of shipbuilders living in Smallhythe at least from the early fourteenth century. In 1488 he was appointed as a "commissioner" in Kent to impress a team of caulkers for work on the king's ship Regent.

== Royal service ==
Brigandyne's introduction to the king's service was through Richard Guildford, a favoured courtier of Henry VII who had overseen the construction at Smallhythe of the Regent, a four-masted carrack with high superstructures ("castles") fore and aft, of 1000 tuns burthen. (Note: The ships' tun of the period was an inexact unit of capacity, based on the number of large barrels (called "tuns") that could be carried.) Brigandyne became a Yeoman of the Crown, holding office in the king's immediate retinue and being granted receipts from some cloth taxation in Kent. Henry appointed him as "Keeper or clerk of my ships" on 19 May 1495, with pay set at twelve pence per day; a further six pence per day was allowed to employ a clerk. In addition to his salary, his position would allow him to profit from the supply of ships' requisites while vessels were being fitted out, or laid up and not at sea. Henry VII selected Brigandyne for the position because he was an able administrator who was knowledgeable in the construction and management of ships. Thereafter, he alone had charge of naval matters.

In June 1495 Brigandyne was ordered to Portsmouth to construct England's first purpose-built dry dock (Note: There is some evidence of a natural dry dock existing in Southampton in the 1430s, consisting of a narrow inlet which could be closed off with clay and logs.) and to superintend the dockyard's military defences. The dry dock was needed because the new warships, such as Regent, drew too much water to occupy king's ships' usual berth in the River Hamble (the previous practice had been to drag the ships onto a mudbank and build a temporary embankment around them).

From then on Brigandyne divided his time between Portsmouth and Kent. In Portsmouth he was responsible for the new ships Peter Pomegranate and Mary Rose (completed 1510 and 1511, respectively), as well as supervising a full programme of repairs in the new dry dock. While at Portsmouth he recruited shipbuilders from Smallhythe to work for him, chartering ships for their transport by sea. In July 1511 he arranged for the newly built Mary Rose to be moved from Portsmouth to the Thames. He was involved with the dockyard defences.

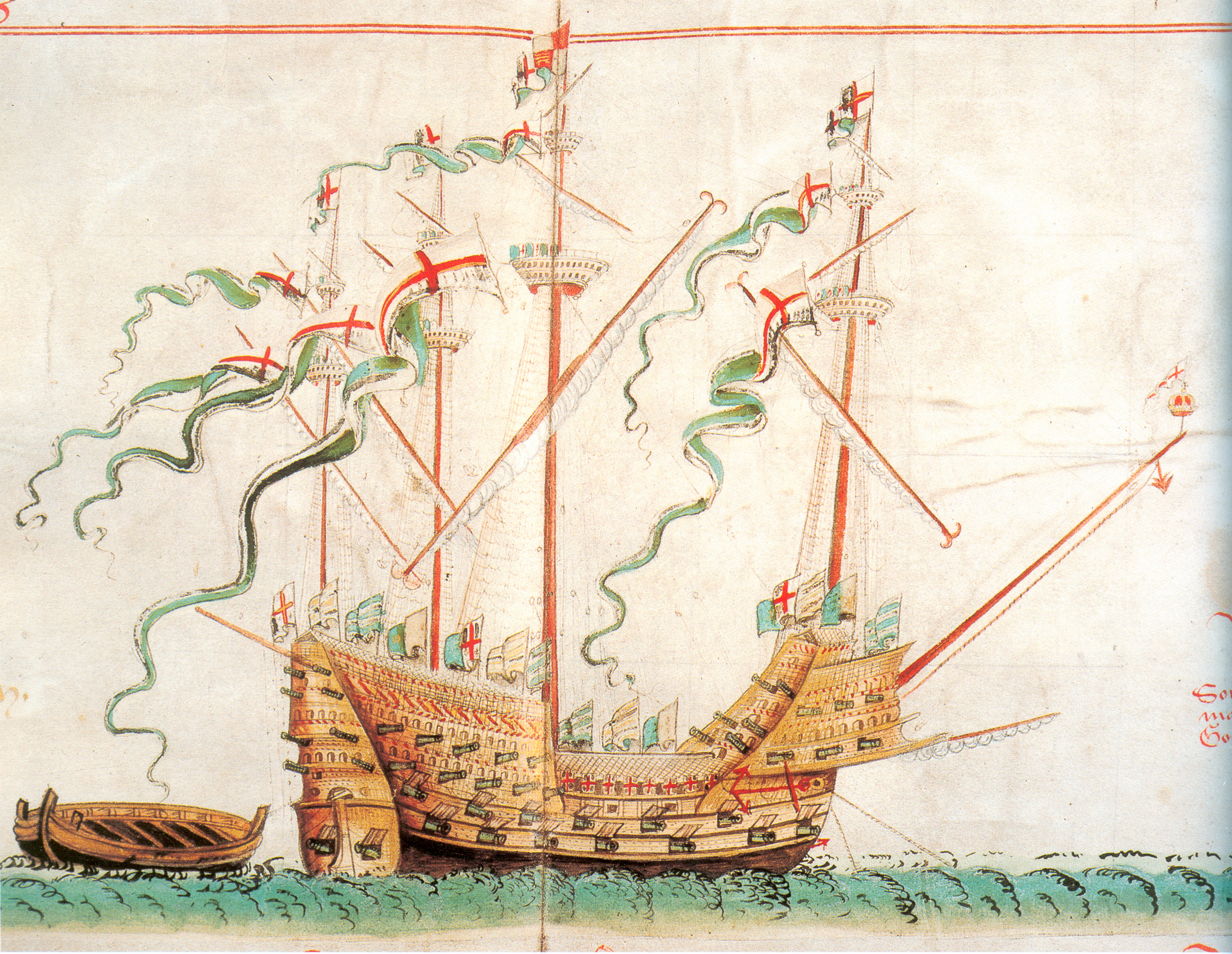
Henry Grace à Dieu in 1546

In Kent in 1512 the new dockyard buildings at Woolwich included purpose-built accommodation for Brigandyne, so he could supervise the construction of the great warship Henry Grace à Dieu, completed in 1514. Vessels of this size could no longer be built at Smallhythe because of silting in the River Rother. He was the elected Bailiff of Tenterden for two years in succession:1517 to 1519. At Woolwich in 1521 he was issuing instructions for the under-cover docking of Henry Grace à Dieu for caulking. Under his direction naval vessels of clinker-built construction, such as Henry Grace à Dieu, were phased out in favour of the carvel type, more suited to the provision of gunports low in the hull for the new, heavier guns.

== Henry VIII ==
In May 1509, as a Yeoman of the Crown, Brigandyne took part in the funeral procession of Henry VII, being granted a length of black fabric from the royal wardrobe for a suit of apparel. On the accession of Henry VIII his royal appointment was reconfirmed by a warrant under the Privy Seal, dated 28 July 1509, and his name continued to appear regularly in state letters and papers until October 1525. He obtained his release (a document stating that all his financial liabilities had been discharged) from the king's service in April 1523.

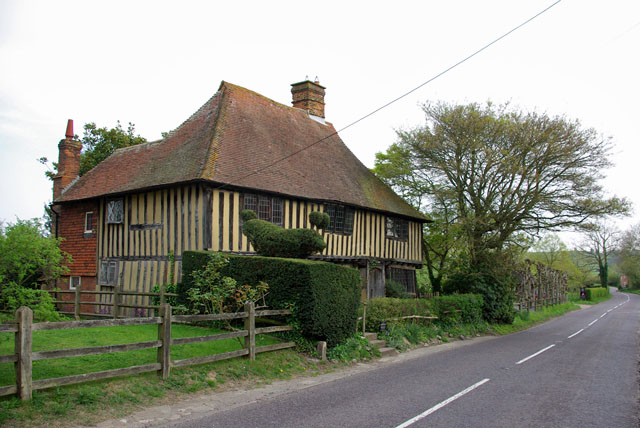
Brigandyne's house in Smallhythe

== Later life ==
Brigandyne maintained his family home at Smallhythe throughout his life and lived there permanently on his retirement. His date of death has not been established. His son John Brigandyne became a ship captain in the royal navy.

== Depiction in poetry ==
In Rudyard Kipling's poem "King Henry VII and the shipwrights" (1910) Brigandyne arrests a man for stealing brass from the warship Mary of the Tower, in dock for repair. Brigandyne admits "I have taken plank and rope and nail," but warns: "steal in measure.". King Henry, looking on in disguise, agrees: "Thy counsel liketh me" he says, and appoints Brigandyne to be Clerk of his ships.
