= Smallhythe Place =

Historic house and theatre museum in Small Hythe, Kent, England

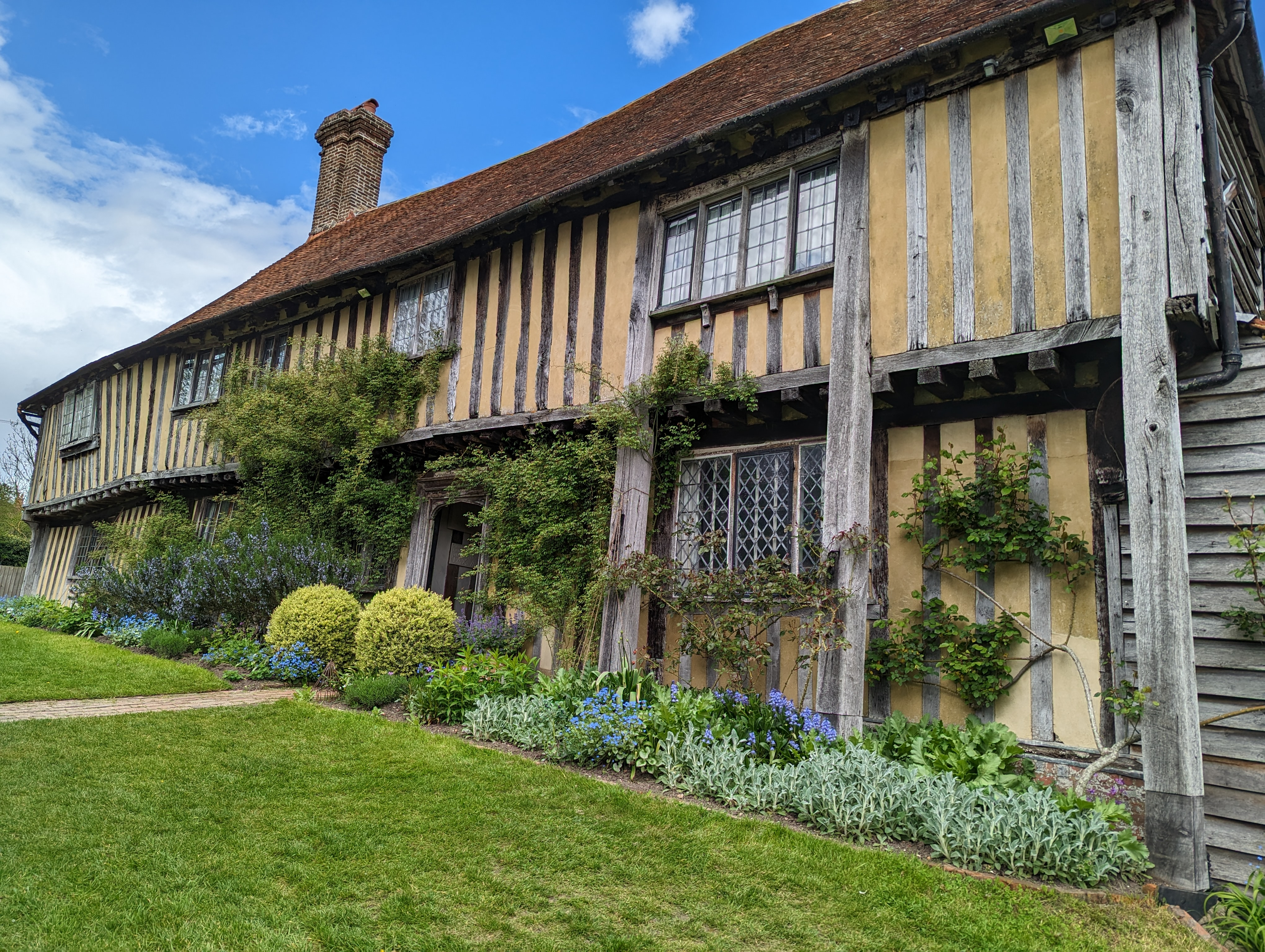
- Smallhythe Place in 2023

- Location within Kent

General information
- Architectural style: Tudor
- Location: Small Hythe, England
- Coordinates: 51°2′17″N 00°41′57″E
- Owner: National Trust

Website
- www.nationaltrust.org.uk/smallhythe-place

Listed Building – Grade II*
- Designated: 8 May 1950
- Reference no.: 1071163

Smallhythe Place in Small Hythe, near Tenterden in Kent, is a half-timbered house built in the late 15th or early 16th century and since 1947 cared for by the National Trust. It was the home of the Victorian actress Ellen Terry from 1899 to her death in the house on 17 July 1928. The house contains Ellen Terry's theatre collection, while the cottage grounds include her rose garden, orchard, nuttery and the working Barn Theatre.

== Early history ==
The design of the house appears to be from the early 16th century and may have been built after a fire in the village of Small Hythe in 1514. The house was originally called 'Port House' and before the River Rother and the sea receded it was associated with the nearby thriving shipyard – in Old English hythe means "landing place". Changes to the flow of the Rother led to the silting-up of the channel and, eventually, the decline of the industry. (Note: A 1998 Time Team archaeological dig uncovered evidence of the historic shipbuilding industry, leading to creation of a new monument classification - Deserted Medieval Shipyard.) The estate subsequently converted to agriculture after the late 17th century, at which point the barn was erected. The barn likely served as storage for both animals and crops, and was expanded during the 19th century.

== Terry's residence ==
Terry first saw the house in 1890 in the company of Henry Irving, the manager of the Lyceum Theatre in London's Covent Garden, with whom she shared a famous theatrical partnership for nearly 24 years. She expressed interest in buying the property, but was unable to do so until 1899 when it became available. The property comprised two cottages (one of which, called the Priest's House, she gave to her daughter) and a barn.

Terry lived in the house for the last 3 decades of her life and it served as a place to relax in between a busy schedule of theatre engagements and international travel. Terry entertained friends there but also relished the time spent caring for her gardens. Her daughter suggested the transformation of the barn into a theatre, but Terry preferred to retain the isolated nature of the estate.

== The museum ==
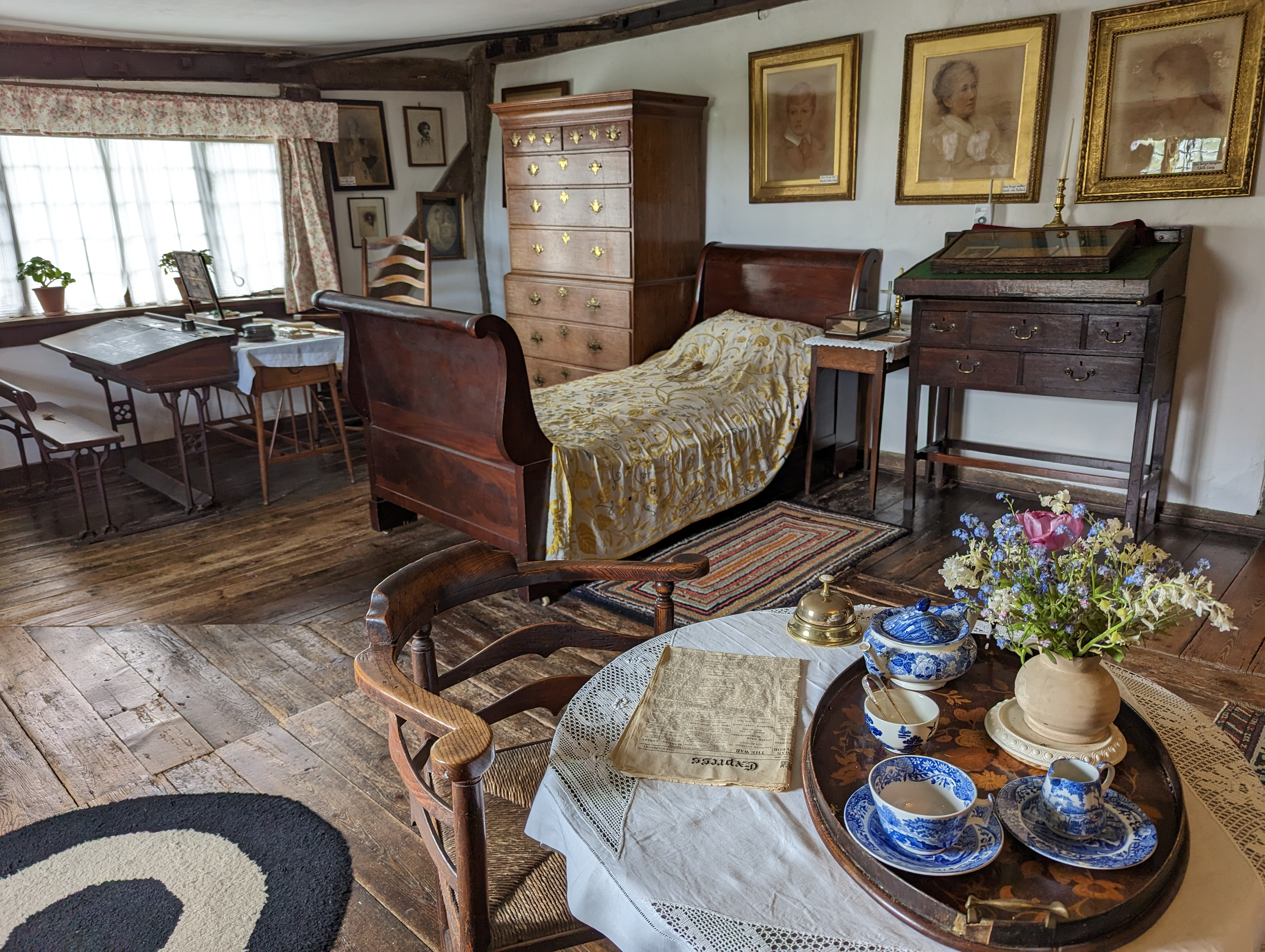
Ellen Terry's bedroom

The house was opened to the public by Terry's daughter Edith Craig in 1929, as a memorial to her mother, showcasing both personal mementos as well as letters collected from a national appeal after her mother's death. The National Trust supported Craig in her running of the museum from 1939, and took over the property when she died in 1947. It was designated as a Grade II* listed building by English Heritage on 8 May 1950.

Smallhythe Place contains many personal and theatrical mementos, including two walls devoted to David Garrick and Sarah Siddons. Other exhibits include a message from Sarah Bernhardt displayed in the Dining Room, a chain worn by Fanny Kemble, Sir Arthur Sullivan's monocle and a visiting card from Alexandre Dumas. There are also several paintings by the artist Clare Atwood, one of the romantic companions of Edith Craig. In the Terry Room (previously used as a sitting room) is a letter from Oscar Wilde begging Terry to accept a copy of his first play. The bedroom remains largely as it was during Terry's lifetime, while the library contains over 3000 volumes, largely those collected by Terry and used during her career.

== The Ellen Terry Costume Collection ==
In addition to a wealth of personal ephemera, Smallhythe Place also hosts an archive of Terry's role in the Aesthetic Movement and the role she played in the design of her stage wardrobe. The Costume Room displays a selection of sumptuous costumes dating from Terry's time at the Lyceum Theatre, in particular three costumes from Henry Irving's spectacular production of Much Ado About Nothing at the Lyceum Theatre and the iridescent beetle-wing dress she wore as Lady Macbeth in 1888 designed by Alice Comyns Carr. The dress was returned to public display in 2011 after 1300 hours of conservation.

== Barn Theatre ==
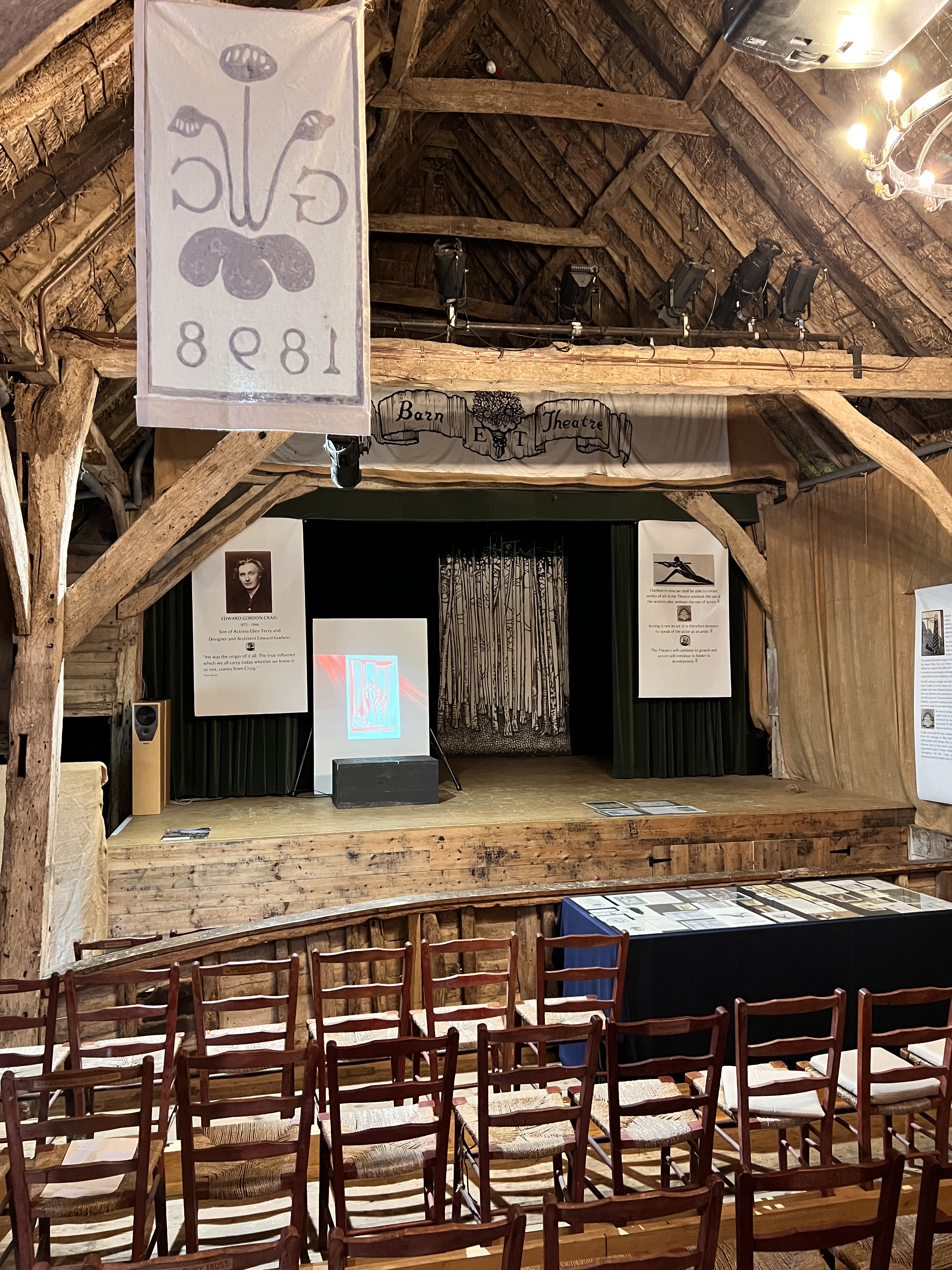
The interior of the Barn Theatre

In 1929, Craig finally did establish a barn theatre in the house's grounds. The 70-seat theatre hosts around 30 productions a year.

Every year since 1929 on the anniversary of Ellen Terry's death there has been a tradition of performing the plays of William Shakespeare. Among the actors who have performed in the theatre have been Peggy Ashcroft, Edith Evans, John Gielgud, Alec Guinness, Nigel Hawthorne, Rachel Kempson, Michael Redgrave, Paul Scofield and Sybil Thorndike.

The first patron of the Barn Theatre was Ellen Terry's great-nephew Sir John Gielgud, who served in the role for 50 years before being succeeded by Donald Sinden, who was patron for 20 years until his death in 2014. He was succeeded by Joanna Lumley, who took up the role in March 2020.

== Sources ==
- Bellamy, Peter S.; Milne, Gustav (2017). "An Archaeological Evaluation oft the Medieval Shipyard Facilities at Small Hythe" (PDF). Kent Archaeology. pp. 353–382.
- Isaac, Veronica (May 2012). "The Art of Costume in the Late Nineteenth Century: Highlights from the Wardrobe of the 'Painter's Actress'". Nineteenth Century Theatre and Film. 39 (1): 93–111. doi:10.7227/NCTF.39.1.8.
- Isaac, Veronica (2018). Ellen Terry at Smallhythe Place, Kent : a souvenir guide. London: National Trust. ISBN 9781911384229.
- Kazmier, Lisa (July 2001). "Her Final Performance: British Culture, Mourning and the Memorialization of Ellen Terry". Mortality. 6 (2): 167–190. doi:10.1080/13576270120051839.
- Lynch, Connor (Spring 2022). "Beetle Shine". Scientist. 36 (1): 24–26. ISSN 0890-3670.
- Melville, Joy (August 1997). "Ellen Terry". British Heritage. 18 (6): 34. ISSN 0195-2633.
- "The Port Community of Smallhythe". National Trust.
- "Smallhythe Place's history". National Trust.
- Oram, Alison (June 2011). "Going on an Outing: the Historic House and Queer Public History". Rethinking History. 15 (2): 189–207. doi:10.1080/13642529.2011.564816.
- Patton, Allyson (November 2004). "Dame Ellen Terry and Smallhythe Place". British Heritage. 25 (5): 58–60. ISSN 0195-2633.
- "The National Trust Announces Return of Famous Beetle Wing Dress: The-National-Trust". PR Newswire US. 18 March 2011.
- Rank, Julia (January 2021). "The Scrapbook as an Archive: Collecting and Curating in the Kate Terry Scrapbook". Theatre Notebook. 75 (1): 23–50. ISSN 0040-5523.
