= Gustardwood common =

Common land in Hertfordshire, England

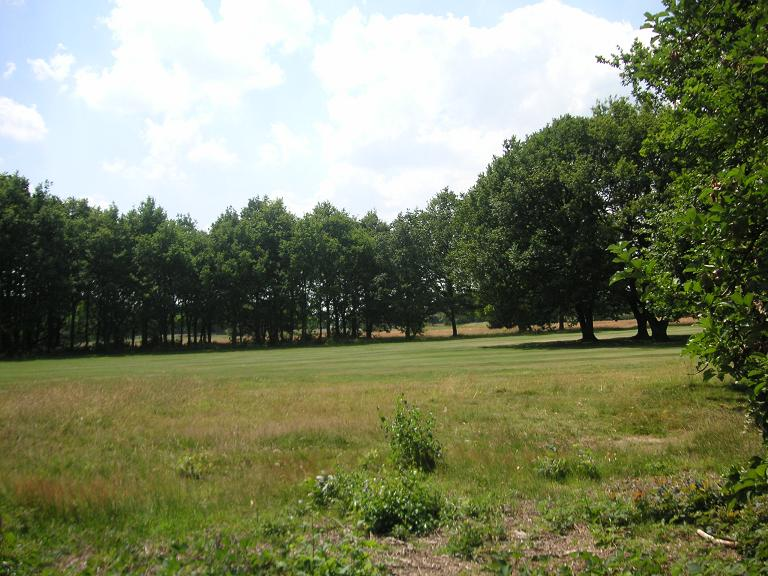
Gustardwood common

Gustardwood common is an area of common land just north of the village of Wheathampstead in Hertfordshire, United Kingdom.

The bulk of the common is now used by the Mid-Herts Golf Club, which was formed in 1892. The first 9-hole course on Gustardwood common was officially opened for play in February 1893. It is one of the earlier golf courses in England. Additional land was purchased by the club from an adjacent farm, but the holes on the common, which is also still used for picnicking, retain a certain unique character.

The only other famous historical association of the common is a link, in some historical records, with the legend of the famous highwaywoman, the "Wicked Lady", generally believed (although only after her death) to have been Lady Katherine Ferrers.
