= Grace Pervades =

Play by David Hare

Grace Pervades is a play by David Hare that explores the lives and long stage relationship between the Victorian actors Henry Irving and Ellen Terry, as well as the lives of her children Edith Craig and Edward Gordon Craig.

It premiered in June 2025 at Theatre Royal, Bath, directed by Jeremy Herrin and starring Ralph Fiennes as Irving and Miranda Raison as Terry. It transferred to the Theatre Royal Haymarket in the West End for a limited run from April to July 2026 with the same stars. Ruby Ashbourne Serkis and Jordan Metcalfe play Edith and Edward Craig. Reviews were mixed to positive, with critics praising Fiennes and especially Raison but finding fault with the "clunky" script, though one critic called it "elegant and witty, a love song to an age that has been jettisoned from contemporary cultural discourse".
