= Ellen Terry =

English actress (1847–1928)

Dame Ellen Terry GBE
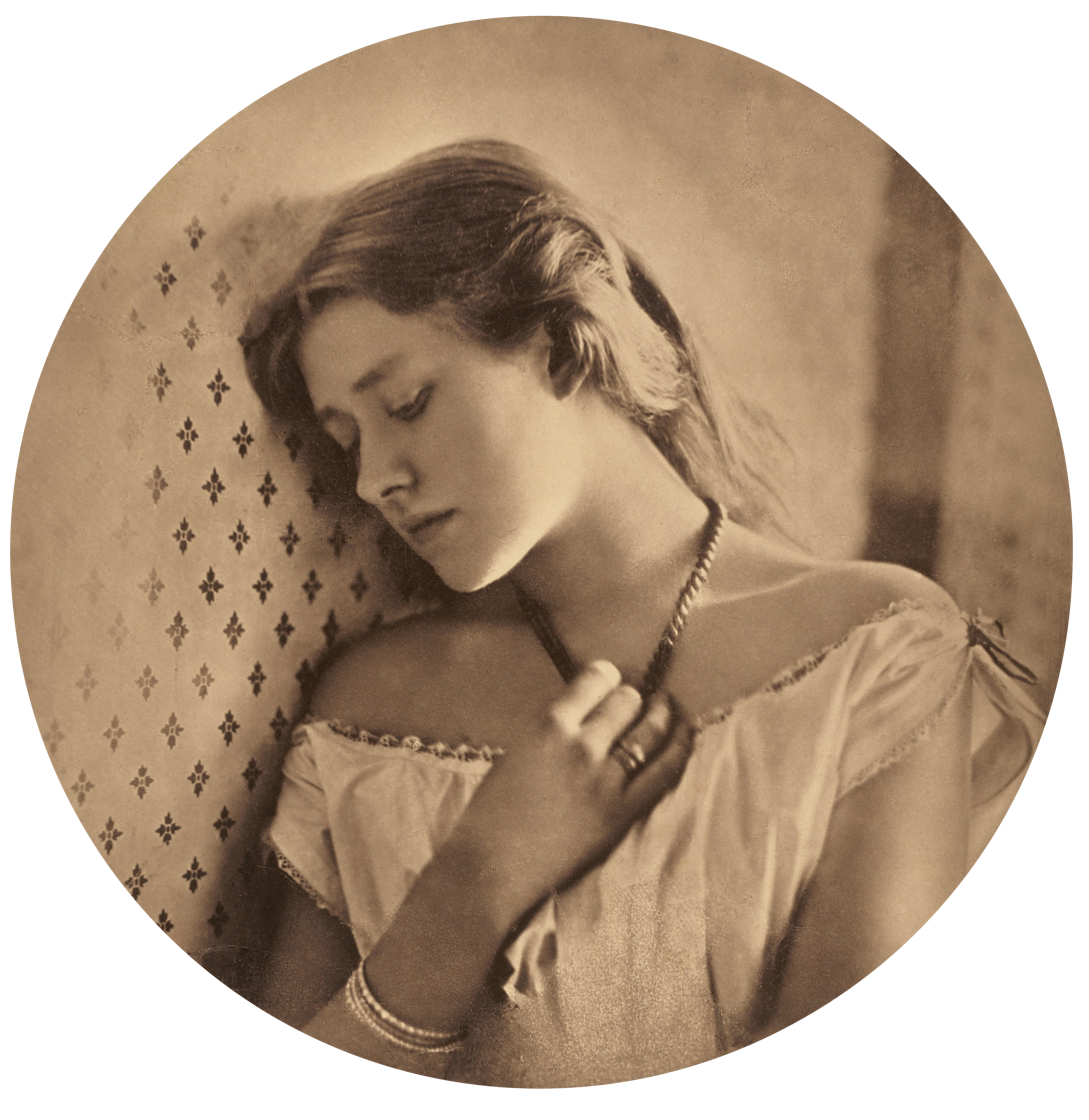
- Portrait by Julia Margaret Cameron, 1864
- Born: Alice Ellen Terry; 27 February 1847; Coventry, Warwickshire, England
- Died: 21 July 1928 (aged 81); Small Hythe, Kent, England
- Resting place: St Paul's, Covent Garden
- Spouses: George Frederic Watts (m. 1864; div. 1877) Charles Clavering Wardell (m. 1877, divorced) James Carew (m. 1907; sep. 1909)
- Partner: Edward William Godwin (1868–1875)
- Children: Edith Craig; Edward Gordon Craig

Signature
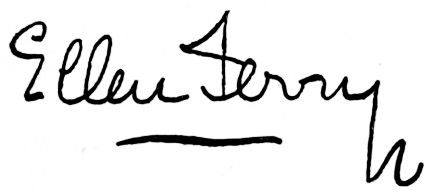

Dame Alice Ellen Terry (27 February 1847 – 21 July 1928) was an English actress of the late 19th and early 20th centuries.

Born into a family of actors, Terry began performing as a child, acting in Shakespeare plays in London, and toured throughout the British provinces in her teens. At 16, she married the 46-year-old artist George Frederic Watts, but they separated within a year. She soon returned to the stage but began a relationship with the architect Edward William Godwin and retired from the stage for six years. She resumed acting in 1874 and was immediately acclaimed for her portrayal of roles in Shakespeare and other classics.

In 1878 she joined Henry Irving's company as his leading lady, and for more than the next two decades she was considered the leading Shakespearean actress in Britain. Two of her most famous roles were Portia in The Merchant of Venice and Beatrice in Much Ado About Nothing. She and Irving also toured with great success in America and Britain.

At the urging of George Bernard Shaw, Terry took over management of London's Imperial Theatre in 1903, opening a new play by Henrik Ibsen. The venture was a financial failure, and Terry turned to touring. She continued to find success on stage until 1920 and especial success in lecture tours discussing the Shakespeare heroines. She also appeared in several films from 1916 to 1922. Her career lasted nearly seven decades.

== Early life and career ==
Terry was born in Coventry, England, the third surviving child born into a theatrical family. Her parents, Benjamin (1818–1896), of Irish descent, and Sarah (née Ballard; 1819–1892), of Scottish ancestry, were childhood friends and began as comic actors in a Portsmouth-based company, where Sarah's father was a master sawyer. (Note: Some sources state that Sarah's father was a Methodist minister, but the biographer Marguerite Steen notes that Ballard was a Wesleyan lay preacher rather than a cleric.) She used the stage name "Miss Yerrett", The two made a poor living in touring companies in their early years. The couple had eleven children, two of whom died in infancy. They had been christened Kate and Ellen after their paternal and maternal grandmothers; these names were reused for their next two daughters. At least five of the surviving nine became actors: Kate (b. 1844), Ellen, Marion, Florence, and Fred. The eldest son, Benjamin (b. 1839), went into commerce and emigrated to Australia and then India, and Tom (b. 1860), a drifter, lived on the fringes of criminality and poverty, constantly helped by his parents and siblings. Two other children, George and Charles, were connected with theatre management. Kate was the grandmother of Val and John Gielgud.

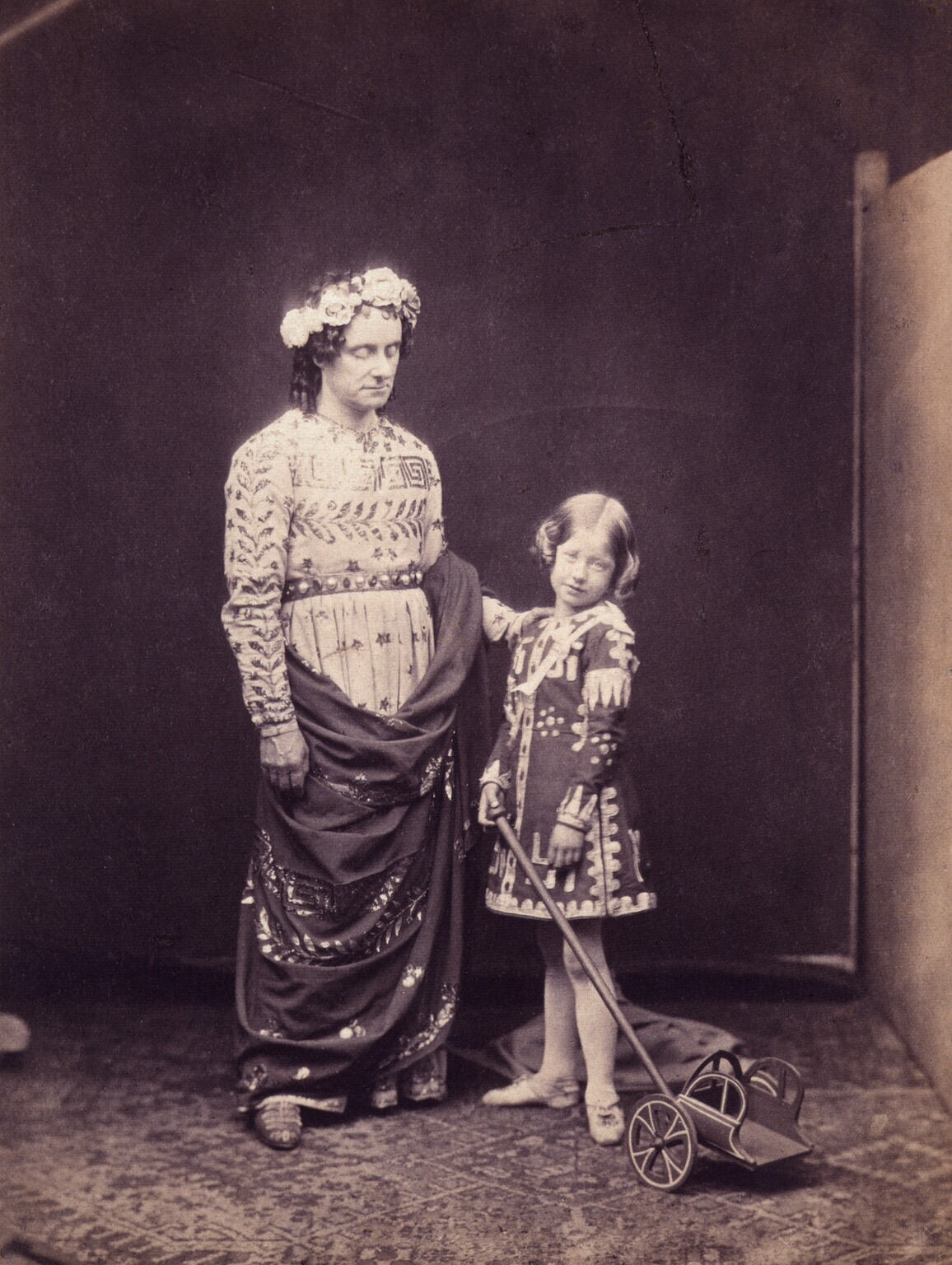
Charles Kean (left) and Ellen Terry in The Winter's Tale, 1856

Benjamin coached his children in good stage diction. Terry later recalled that he "always corrected me if I pronounced any word in a slipshod fashion, and if I now speak my language well it is in no small degree due to my early training." Kate began acting at age 3; by 1851 she had received enough notice in the British provinces that she was invited to audition for Charles Kean of London's Princess's Theatre, who engaged her, and then her father, in his company. The family moved to London, and Sarah worked in the theatre's wardrobe department. Kean and especially his wife, Ellen Kean, were excellent teachers and models for young actors. Ellen Terry made her first stage appearance at age nine, as Mamillius in Shakespeare's The Winter's Tale in 1856 alongside her sister and father in small roles. She also played the roles of Puck in A Midsummer Night's Dream (1856, with Kate as Titania), Prince Arthur in King John (1858), and Fleance in Macbeth (1859), continuing at the Princess's Theatre until the Keans' retirement in 1859. While at the Princess's, the Keans introduced the girls to a circle of artists and playwrights, including Charles Reade and Tom Taylor. During the theatre's summer closures starting in 1856, Terry's father presented farces in Portsmouth, starring Terry and Kate; Terry loved playing badly behaved boys onstage, delighting the provincial audience. In the summer of 1859, Benjamin Terry presented drawing-room entertainments featuring his daughters in the concert room of the Royal Colosseum, Regent's Park, London, and then on tour. Also in 1859, Terry appeared in Tom Taylor's comedy Nine Points of the Law at London's Olympic Theatre. She then played in melodrama at the Royalty Theatre, managed by Madame Albina de Rhona, while Kate starred in Mr and Mrs Alfred Wigan's company at St James's Theatre.

In 1862, Terry joined Kate in J. H. Chute's stock company at the Theatre Royal in Bristol, a strong company that also featured Marie Wilton and Madge Robertson, where she played a wide variety of parts, including burlesque roles requiring singing and dancing, as well as Nerissa in The Merchant of Venice and Hero in Much Ado About Nothing. In 1863, Chute opened the Theatre Royal, Bath, where 15-year-old Terry appeared as Titania in A Midsummer Night's Dream. The family then returned to London where Kate starred at the Lyceum Theatre, while Ellen joined J. B. Buckstone's company at the Haymarket Theatre in Shakespeare roles as well as Sheridan plays and modern comedies. Her lack of maturity, though, led to such a bad experience for her there, that she became disenchanted with theatre.

== Watts and Godwin ==
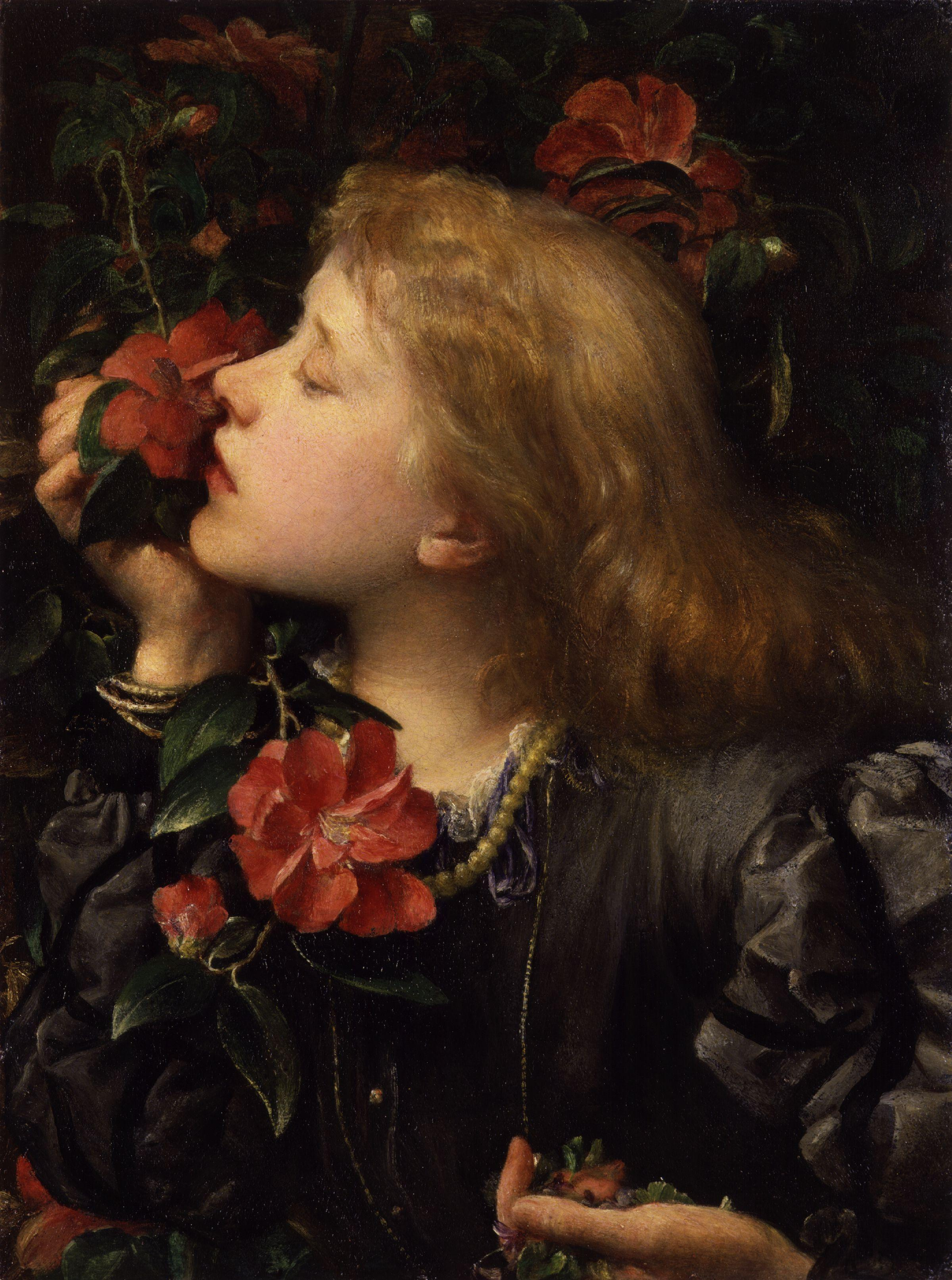
Choosing: painting by first husband, George Frederic Watts c. 1864

In London, while Terry was still engaged at the Haymarket, she and Kate were the subject of The Sisters, painted by the eminent artist George Frederic Watts at his studio home in the annex of Little Holland House, the home of Sara Monckton Prinsep and her husband. His famous portraits of Terry include Choosing, in which she must select between earthly vanities, symbolised by showy but scentless camellias, and nobler values symbolised by humble-looking but fragrant violets. His other famous portraits of her include Ophelia and Watchman. At first Watts was interested in Kate, but he soon transferred his attentions to Ellen. She, in turn, was impressed with Watts's art, sense of style and elegant lifestyle, and she wished to please her parents by making an advantageous marriage; her friend Tom Taylor also was in favor of the union. Though Watts was vain, self-centered, unattractive and three decades her senior, she agreed to marry him. She left the stage during the run of Tom Taylor's hit comedy Our American Cousin at the Haymarket, in which she played Mary Meredith.

Terry and Watts married on 20 February 1864 at St Barnabas Church, Addison Road, Kensington, seven days before her 17th birthday; Watts was 46. At Little Holland House, she met many cultured, talented and important people in his social circle, such as the poets Robert Browning and Alfred, Lord Tennyson, prime ministers William Ewart Gladstone and Benjamin Disraeli, and Princep's sister, the photographer Julia Margaret Cameron. Because of the marriage and Watts's paintings of her, she "became a cult figure for poets and painters of the later Pre-Raphaelite and Aesthetic movements, including Oscar Wilde". Terry soon became uncomfortable in the role of child bride. Watts was a cold and thoughtless husband, and some of his admirers, especially his patron, salon organiser and confidante, Prinsep, became increasingly hostile to her. Terry began to behave erratically and was banned from the salons and other social occasions, and Watts no longer found her a source of inspiration for his paintings. Meanwhile, one of the visitors to the Watts home was the progressive architect-designer and essayist, and a recent widower, Edward William Godwin. He was interested in theatre, fashion and design and was a good conversationalist. Both Watts and Terry enjoyed his company, and they visited him at his architecture practice. Eventually Terry visited alone. One night Terry stayed with Godwin until morning, saying that Godwin had been ill, and she had tended to him. Watts and Princep disbelieved her, and her social reputation was ruined. Watts and Terry separated after only ten months, and she returned to her parents' home.

She returned to acting in 1866, touring with her father and playing a small role in The Hunchback at the Olympic Theatre where her sister was then starring, but she had lost her love of the theatre. In 1867, Terry performed in the Wigans' company in several Tom Taylor pieces, including A Sheep in Wolf's Clothing at the Adelphi Theatre, The Antipodes at the Theatre Royal, Drury Lane, and Still Waters Run Deep at the Queen's Theatre, Long Acre. She would play there later that year for the first time opposite Henry Irving in a single performance of the title roles in Katherine and Petruchio, David Garrick's version of The Taming of the Shrew. Early in 1868, still unhappy and disinterested in theatre, Terry left the Wigans company abruptly and, knowing it would upset her parents, went to live with Godwin at a house in Harpenden, north of London. She retired from acting for six years. She was happy, in love, and enjoying country life. As she was still married to Watts, not finalising the divorce until 1877, she and Godwin could not marry, and their cohabitation was considered scandalous. They soon had a daughter, Edith Craig, born in 1869 and a son, Edward Gordon Craig, born in 1872. The children used the surname Wardell to deflect the stigma of illegitimacy during Terry's second marriage and chose Craig years later. (Note: On holiday in Scotland in 1888, the family were intrigued by the island Ailsa Craig, and Terry children adopted the name.) Goodwin built a house for them in Harpenden called Fallows Green. A widowed neighbor who had befriended Terry, Mrs Rumball, became her constant companion for the ensuing 30 years.

== Return to acting; Wardell ==
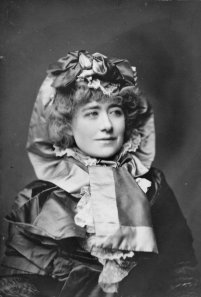
Terry, c. 1880

The relationship cooled in 1874 amid Godwin's preoccupation with his architectural practice and, due to Terry's freespending ways, they were financial difficulties. He fell in love with another woman, Beatrice Phillips, whom he later married. The same year Terry returned to the stage at the invitation of her old friend Charles Reade and played roles in several of his works, earning critical praise: Philippa Chester in The Wandering Heir; Susan Merton in It's Never Too Late to Mend; and Helen Rolleston in Our Seamen. Later in 1874 she performed at the Crystal Palace with Charles Wyndham as Volante in The Honeymoon by John Tobin and as Kate Hardcastle in She Stoops to Conquer by Oliver Goldsmith.

In 1875, Terry was engaged at the Prince of Wales's Theatre managed by Wilton (now Effie Bancroft) and her husband Squire Bancroft. In her first role there Terry gave an acclaimed performance as Portia in The Merchant of Venice. Godwin was in charge of the artistic designs, including Terry's costumes; even after the two separated in 1875, he continued to design Terry's costumes. Oscar Wilde wrote a sonnet upon seeing her in this role: "No woman Veronese looked upon/Was half so fair as thou whom I behold." She recreated this role many times in her career until her last appearance as Portia in London in 1917.

In 1876 she moved to the Court Theatre, under Hare's management, where she appeared as Lady Teazle in The School for Scandal, Blanche Haye in a revival of T. W. Robertson's Ours, and the title role in Olivia by William Gorman Wills (an adaptation of The Vicar of Wakefield), a role written for her, in which she was again strongly praised by the public and the critics, and which ran for several seasons. She reconciled with her parents, whom she had seen little of since she began to live out-of-wedlock with Godwin. Her sister Marion had now burst onto the London scene as a comic actress at the Haymarket. There Marion acted alongside two handsome actors: Johnston Forbes-Robertson and Charles Clavering Wardell (stage name Charles Kelly; 1839–1885), whom Ellen had met while appearing in Reade's plays. Both courted Ellen, who was now divorced. In November 1877 Terry married Wardell, who was a kind stepfather to her two children but had a drinking problem. The two acted together during the marriage, especially on summer tours between London seasons. During their 1879 tour, she played Beatrice for the first time in Much Ado About Nothing. They separated in 1881.

== Irving and the Lyceum ==
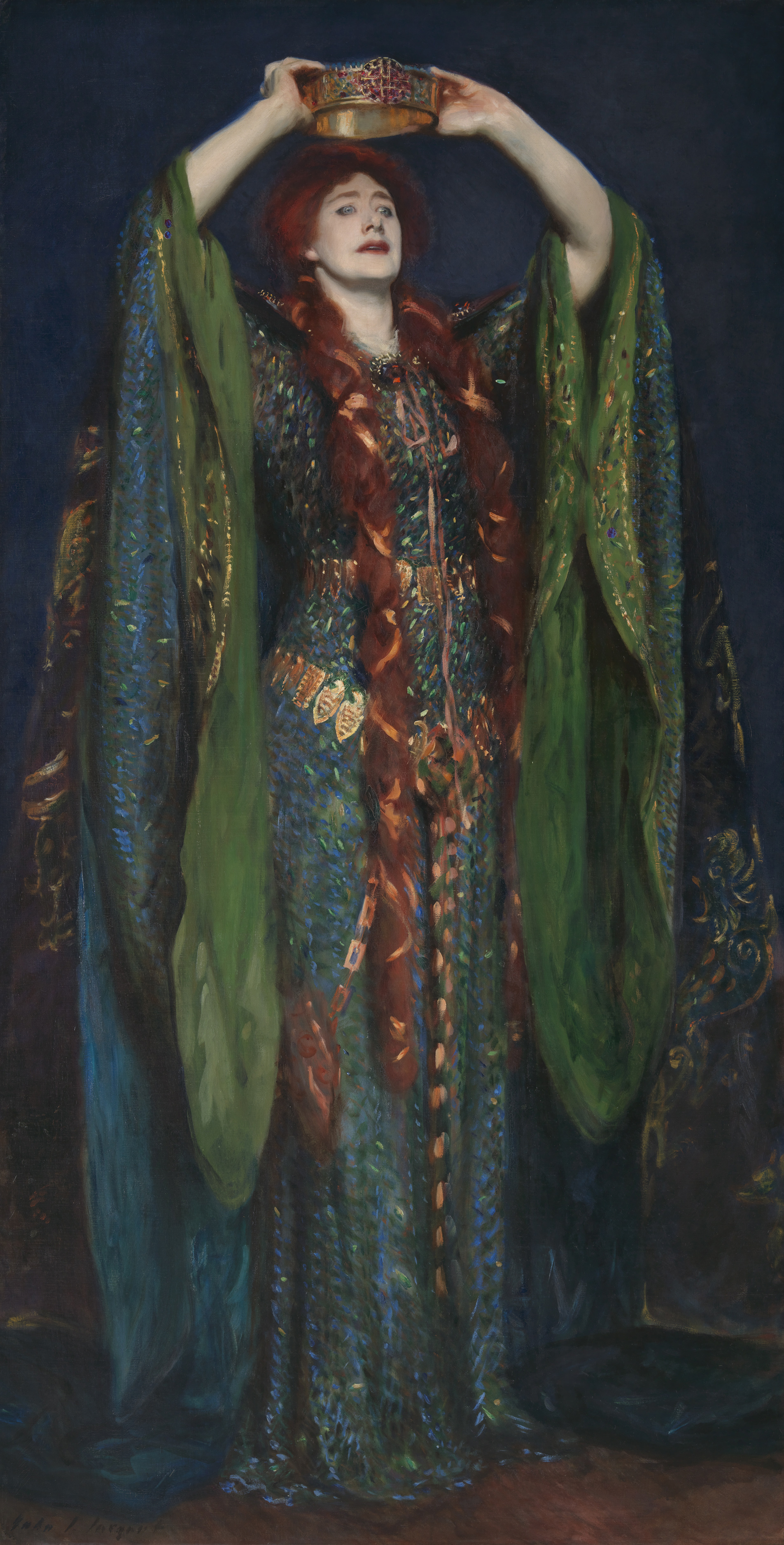
Ellen Terry as Lady Macbeth, by John Singer Sargent, 1889

In 1878 Henry Irving, the new manager of the Lyceum Theatre, engaged the 30-year-old Terry as his leading lady at a generous salary, beginning with Ophelia opposite Irving's Hamlet. She again earned good notices and became fast friends with Irving, who also enjoyed her children. She next starred as Pauline in The Lady of Lyons by Edward Bulwer-Lytton, Lady Anne in Richard III, Queen Henrietta Maria in Wills's drama Charles I (all in 1879). The Times said of Terry's acting in Paul Terrier's All is Vanity, or the Cynic's Defeat the same year, "Miss Terry's Iris was a performance of inimitable charm, full of movement, ease, and laughter ... the most exquisite harmony and natural grace ... such an Iris might well have turned the head of Diogenes himself." Their production of The Merchant of Venice, opening at the end of 1879, ran for an unusual 250 nights, and success followed success in the Shakespeare canon as well as in Tennyson, Bulwer-Lytton, Reade, Willis, Sardou and other classic and contemporary playwrights. She was soon regarded as the leading Shakespearean actress in Britain. In partnership with Irving, she reigned as such for over 20 years until they left the Lyceum in 1902.

In 1880, at the Lyceum, she played the title role in an adaptation of King René's Daughter called Iolanthe. The Era wrote: "Nothing more winning and enchanting than the grace, and simplicity, and girlish sweetness of the blind Iolanthe as shown by Miss Ellen Terry has within our memory been seen upon the stage. The assumption was delightfully perfect. ... Exquisite ... exercise of the peculiarly fascinating powers of Miss Ellen Terry, who achieved an undoubted triumph ... and was cheered again and again". Her roles in the early 1880s included Camma in Tennyson's short tragedy The Cup (1881, with costumes by Godwin), Desdemona in Othello also in 1881, Juliet in Romeo and Juliet (1882), Beatrice in Much Ado About Nothing, another of her signature roles (1882 and often thereafter), Jeanette in The Lyons Mail (1883) and the title part in Reade's romantic comedy Nance Oldfield the same year. Terry made her American debut in 1883, playing Queen Henrietta opposite Irving in Charles I. Among the other roles she portrayed on this and six subsequent North American tours with Irving were Jeanette, Ophelia, Beatrice, Viola and her most famous role, Portia.

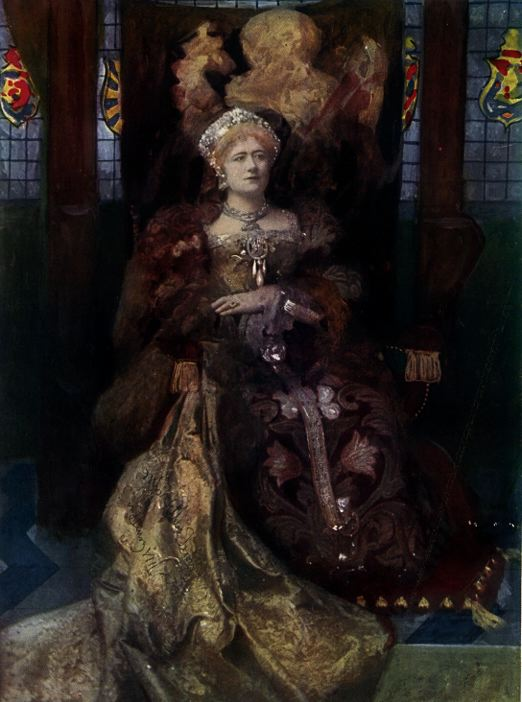
As Katherine in Henry VIII

Terry's Viola in Twelfth Night (1884) was cut short by a dangerous infection that struck on opening night. Her sister Marion took over the role and also substituted for her in a revival of Willis's Olivia, when Terry was again ill. In 1885, however, the theatre had its biggest commercial hit in a long-running adaptation of Faust by Wills (1885), with Ellen as Margaret. Terry played Lady Macbeth in the Lyceum's "lavish" Macbeth (1888, with incidental music by Arthur Sullivan), resplendent in a gown by Alice Comyns Carr covered in green beetle wings; John Singer Sargent painted her in the dress. The next year she was the mother of the Comte St Valery (played by her son Edward) in The Dead Heart by Watts Phillips, then Katherine of Aragon in Irving's grand-scale production of Henry VIII (1892), Cordelia in King Lear the same year, Rosamund de Clifford in Becket by Alfred Tennyson (1893), Guinevere in King Arthur by J. Comyns Carr, with incidental music by Sullivan (1895).

In 1895, Irving became the first person knighted for theatrical activities, proud of the recognition that this brought for his profession. By this time, however, the Lyceum was in debt, its scenery warehouse burned, destroying 44 productions, and Irving suffered a permanent knee injury, marking the beginning of ongoing health issues. Also, by this time, Terry's memory was becoming a problem, and she increasingly relied on prompters. She played Imogen in Cymbeline (1896), the title character in Victorien Sardou and Émile Moreau's Madame Sans-Gêne (1897). Terry's children joined the Lyceum company as actors, Edith from 1887 for several years, and Edward from 1889 to 1897, but both eventually retired from the stage to go on to other careers. Edith, among other endeavors, created costumes for Terry into the 20th century. In 1899, Terry toured as Desdemona and the title character in The Lady of Lyons but was back at the Lyceum as Volumnia in Coriolanus in 1901 and as Portia in Merchant in 1902. The Lyceum was bankrupt and closed. Their last performance together was in a charity matinee at Drury Lane in 1903, again as Portia and Shylock.

Whether Irving and Terry ever had a romantic relationship has been the subject of much speculation. According to Sir Michael Holroyd's book about Irving and Terry, A Strange Eventful History, after Irving's death, Terry stated that she and Irving had been lovers and that: "We were terribly in love for a while". Irving was separated, but not divorced from his spiteful wife, who kept their children from him. Terry had separated from Wardell in 1881, and Irving was godfather to both her children. They travelled on holiday together, and Irving wrote tender letters to Terry. Moira Shearer's biography of Terry calls it "romantic fiction" and notes that biographies by Laurence Irving, Olive Terry and Roger Manvell all disclaim the idea. She also points out that in his later years, Irving had found a loving partner in Eliza Aria. In London, Terry lived in Earls Court with her children and pets during the 1880s, first in Longridge Road, then Barkston Gardens in 1889, but she kept country homes. In 1900, she bought her farmhouse in Small Hythe, Kent, where she lived for the rest of her life.

== Shaw, Ibsen, Barrie ==
At His Majesty's Theatre in 1902 Terry played Mistress Page in The Merry Wives of Windsor, with Herbert Beerbohm Tree as Falstaff and Madge Kendal as Mistress Ford. In the 1890s, Terry had struck up a friendship and conducted a famous correspondence with George Bernard Shaw, a harsh critic of Irving, who wished to begin a theatrical venture with her. In 1903, Terry formed a new theatrical company, taking over management of the Imperial Theatre with her son; she hoped the venture would showcase his set design and directing talents and her daughter's costume designs. The venture was intended to focus on the plays of Shaw and Henrik Ibsen. It began with the latter's The Vikings in 1903, with Terry as the warlike Hiordis, a misjudged role for her. The play was a flop, and she hurried onto the stage Much Ado, opposite Oscar Asche, but the theatre was a failure for Terry. She then toured the English provinces and created the title role, written for her, in J. M. Barrie's Alice Sit-by-the-Fire at the Duke of York's Theatre (1905). Irving died in October that year, and the distraught Terry briefly left the stage.

In April 1906, she returned as Lady Cecily Wayneflete, another role written for her, in Shaw's Captain Brassbound's Conversion at the Court Theatre and later toured successfully in that role in Britain and America. On 12 June 1906, her golden jubilee was commemorated by a star-studded gala performance at the Drury Lane Theatre, for Terry's benefit, at which Enrico Caruso sang, W. S. Gilbert directed a performance of Trial by Jury, Tree, Eleonora Duse, Mrs. Patrick Campbell, Lillie Langtry, Gabrielle Réjane, Gertie Millar, Nellie Melba, and more than 20 members of Terry's family performed an act of Much Ado about Nothing with her, among other performances. The benefit raised £6,000 for Terry. By this time, with her memory and eyesight fading, Edith became more involved in managing Terry's career. Terry next appeared at His Majesty's Theatre as Hermione in Tree's production of The Winter's Tale. In 1907 she toured America in Captain Brassbound's Conversion under the direction of Charles Frohman. During that tour, on 22 March 1907, now aged 59, she married her co-star, the American James Carew, who had appeared with her at the Court Theatre. He was 30 years her junior, and not popular with her family, especially Edith. The couple separated after two years, although they never divorced and remained friendly.

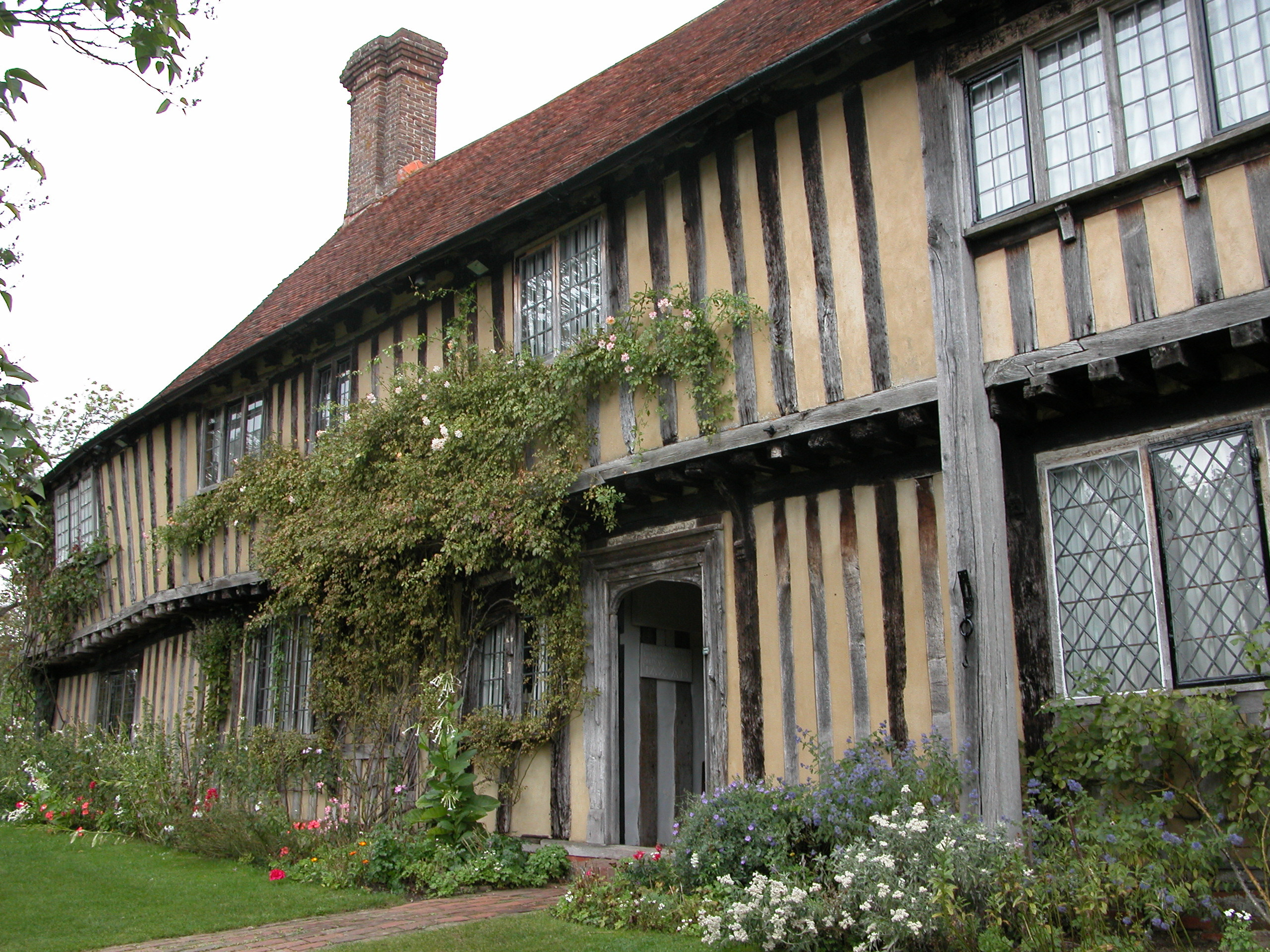
Smallhythe Place, Terry's home from 1900 to 1928

In 1908 she was back at His Majesty's, playing Aunt Imogen in W. Graham Robertson's fairy play Pinkie and the Fairies. She played Nance Oldfield in A Pageant of Great Women written in 1909 by Cicely Hamilton and directed by Edith. In 1910 she toured in the provinces (with Archibald Joyce) and then in the US, acting, giving recitations and lecturing with much success on the Shakespeare heroines. Returning to England, she played roles such as Nell Gwynne in The First Actress (1911) by Christopher St. John (a pseudonym for Christabel Marshall, Edith's lover), one of the first productions of the Pioneer Players theatre society, founded in 1911 by Craig and for which Ellen Terry served as President. Also in 1911, she recorded scenes from five Shakespeare roles for the Victor Talking Machine Company, which are the only known recordings of her voice. In 1914 to 1915, Terry toured Australasia, the US and Britain, again reciting and lecturing on the Shakespeare heroines. While in the US, she underwent an operation for the removal of cataracts from both eyes, but the operation was only partly successful. In 1916, she played Darling in Barrie's The Admirable Crichton (1916). During the First World War she performed in many war benefits.

== Last years ==
In 1916 she appeared in her first film as Julia Lovelace in Her Greatest Performance and continued to act in London and on tour, also playing supporting roles in a few more films through 1922, including Victory and Peace (1918), Pillars of Society (1920), Potter's Clay (1922), and The Bohemian Girl (1922) as Buda the nursemaid. During this time, she continued to lecture on Shakespeare throughout England and North America. She also gave scenes from Shakespeare plays in music halls under the management of Oswald Stoll. Her last fully staged role was as the Nurse in Romeo and Juliet at the Lyric Theatre on Shaftesbury Avenue in 1919. She returned to the stage to play Susan Wildersham in Walter de la Mare's fairy play, Crossings, in November 1925 at the Lyric Hammersmith.

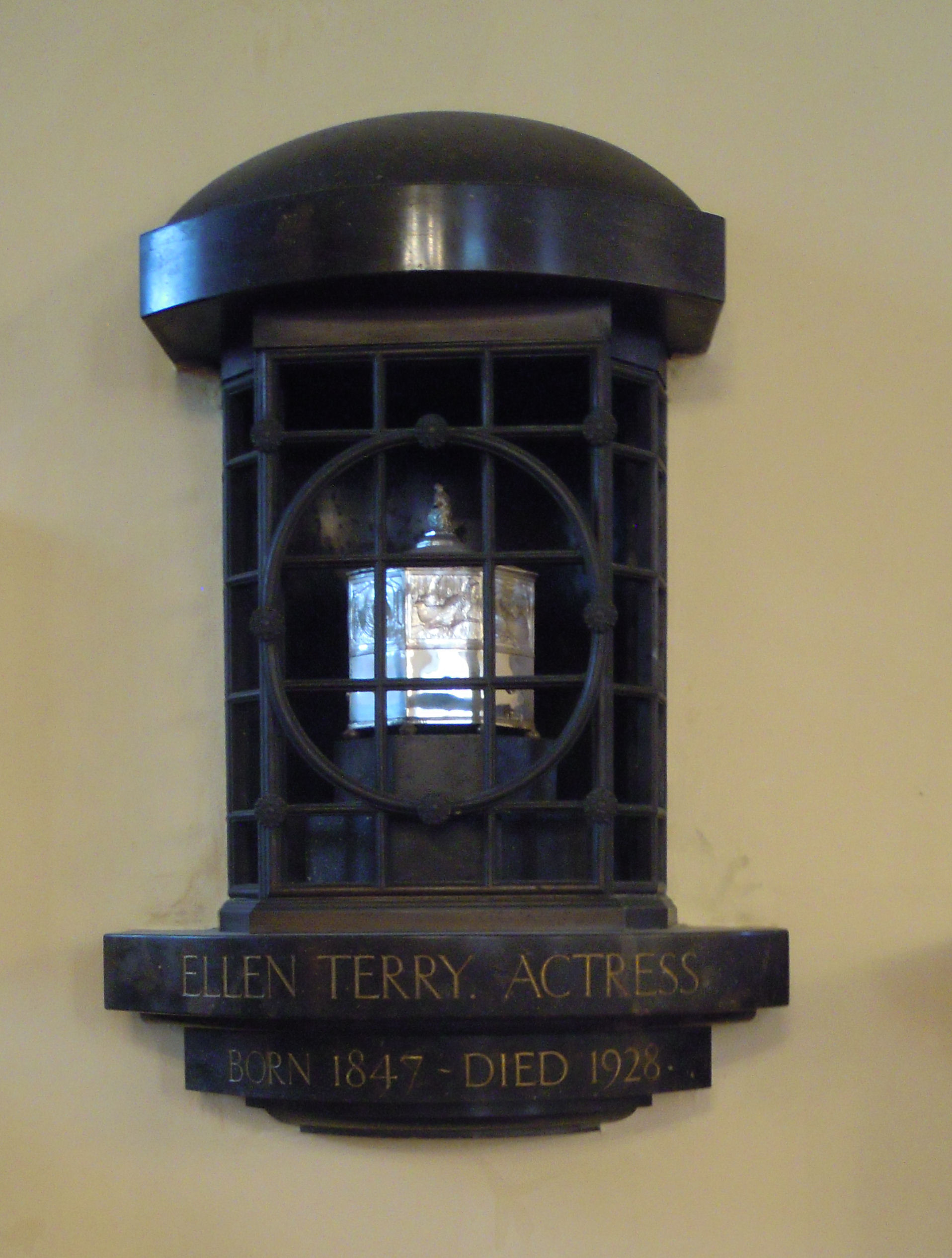
Terry's ashes in St Paul's, Covent Garden, London

In 1922 the University of St Andrews conferred an honorary LLD upon Terry, and in 1925 she was appointed Dame Grand Cross of the Order of the British Empire by King George V, only the second actress, after Geneviève Ward, to be created a dame for her professional achievements. (Note: The actress May Whitty was created DBE before Ward and Terry, but in her case (1918) it was awarded for her charity work during the First World War.) In her last years, she gradually lost her eyesight and suffered from senility, but she enjoyed time with her grandchildren and continued to love letter writing. Stephen Coleridge anonymously published an annotated volume of his correspondence with Terry, The Heart of Ellen Terry, in 1928.

== Death and legacy ==
On 21 July 1928, Terry died of a cerebral haemorrhage at her home at Smallhythe Place, near Tenterden, Kent, aged 81. Her son Edward later recalled, "Mother looked 30 years old ... a young beautiful woman lay on the bed, like Juliet on her bier". Margaret Winser created a death mask. Terry was cremated at Golders Green Crematorium. Her ashes are kept in a silver chalice on the right side of the chancel of the actors' church, St Paul's, Covent Garden, London, where a memorial tablet was unveiled by Sir John Martin-Harvey.

After her death, the Ellen Terry Memorial Museum was founded by Edith Craig in her mother's memory at Smallhythe Place, an early 16th-century house that she bought at the turn of the 20th century. The museum was taken over by the National Trust in 1947. Edith became a theatre director, producer, costume designer, and an early pioneer of the women's suffrage movement in England. Edward became a scenery and effects designer, director, essayist and illustrator; he also founded the Gordon Craig School for the Art of the Theatre in Florence, Italy, in 1913. The actor John Gielgud was her great-nephew. The illustrator Helen Craig is Terry's great-granddaughter.

An archive of Ellen Terry memorabilia is held by Coventry University, which also has an Ellen Terry Building, the former Odeon cinema in Jordan's Well. David Hare's play Grace Pervades explores the lives of Irving, Terry and her children. It premiered in 2025 at Theatre Royal, Bath, transferring in 2026 to the Theatre Royal, Haymarket.

== Gallery ==
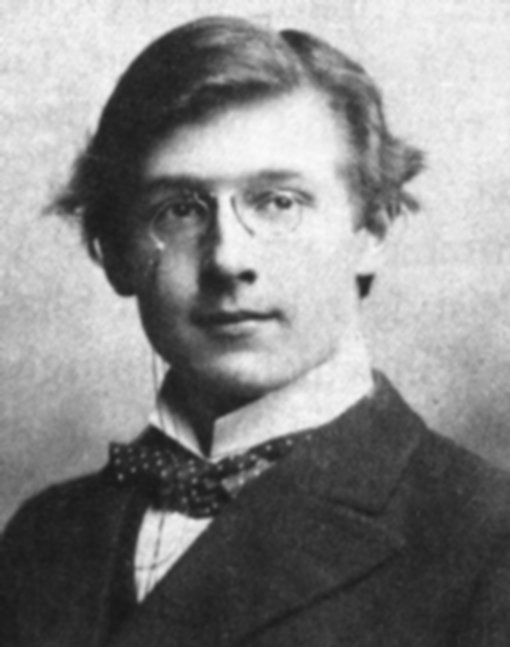
Terry's son, Edward Gordon Craig

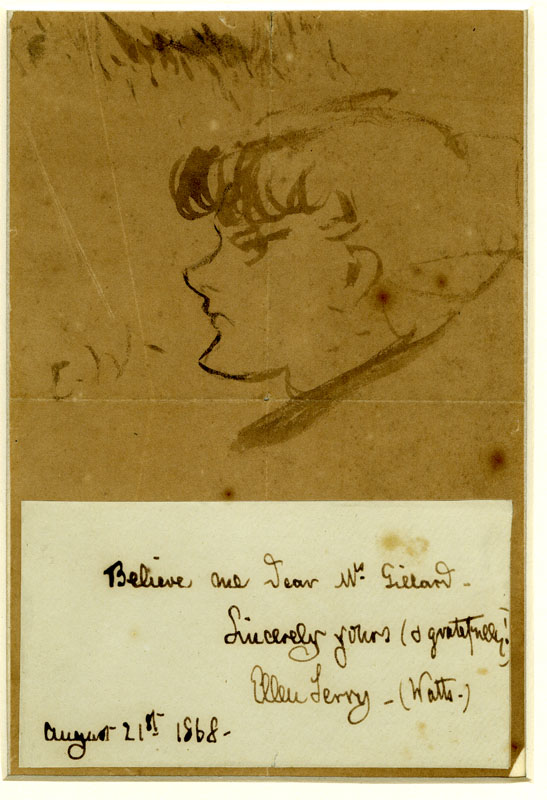
An 1868 self-caricature signed "Ellen Terry (Watts)".

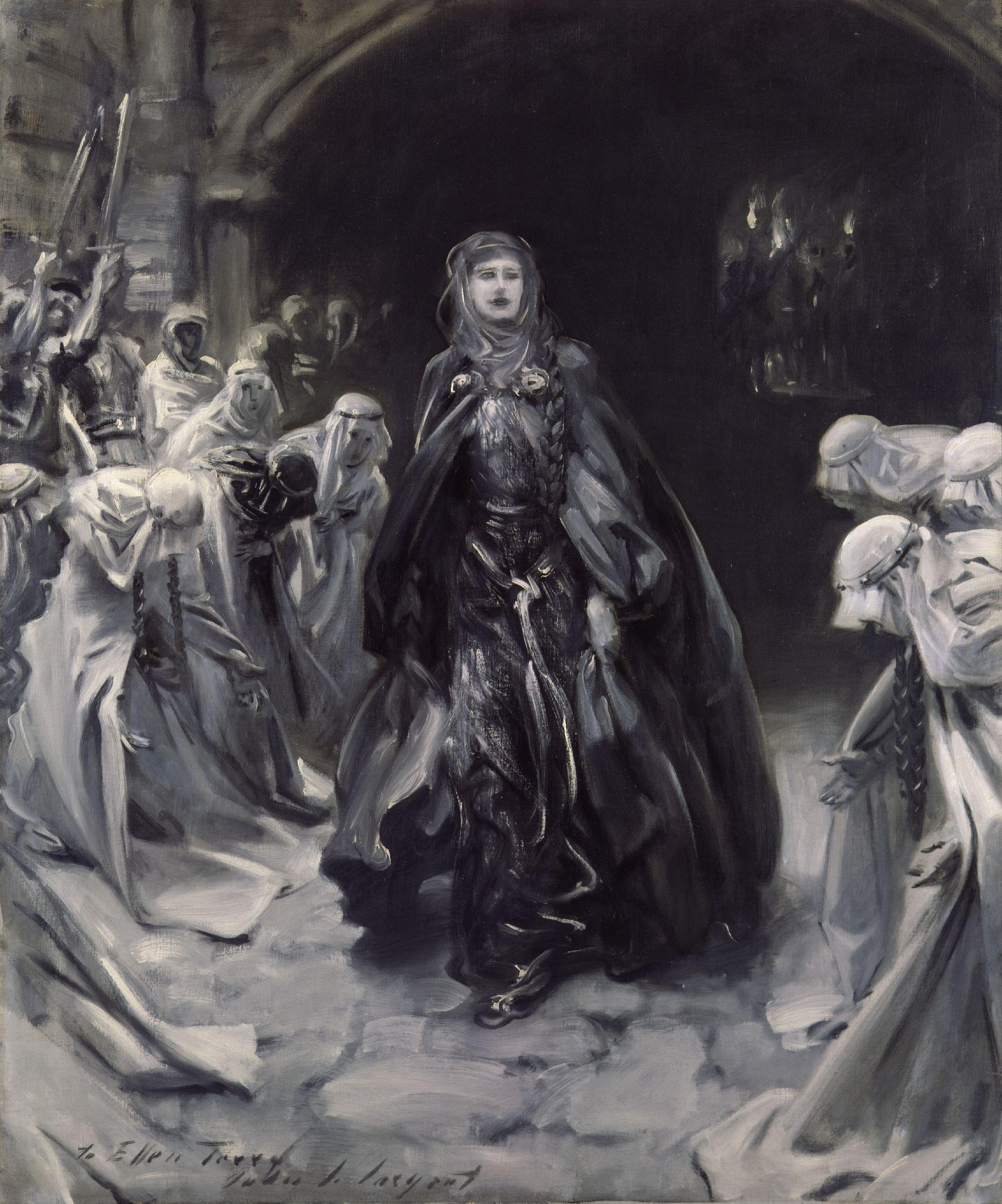
Drawing by Sargent for Terry's golden jubilee programme, 1906

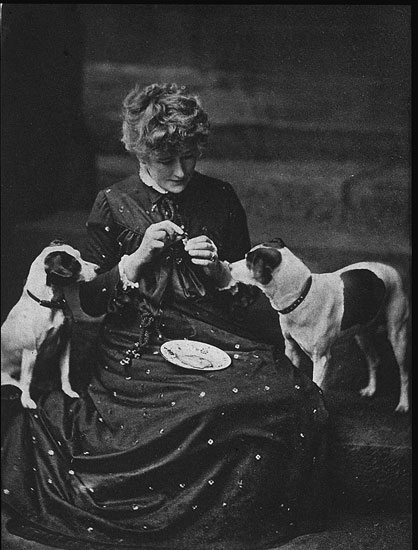
With pets Fussie and Drummie in the 1880s

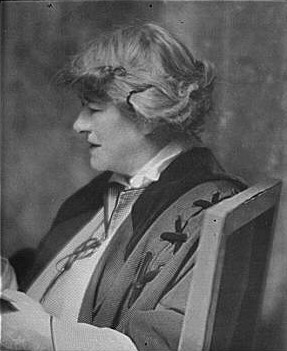
Portrait photograph of Terry, 1915

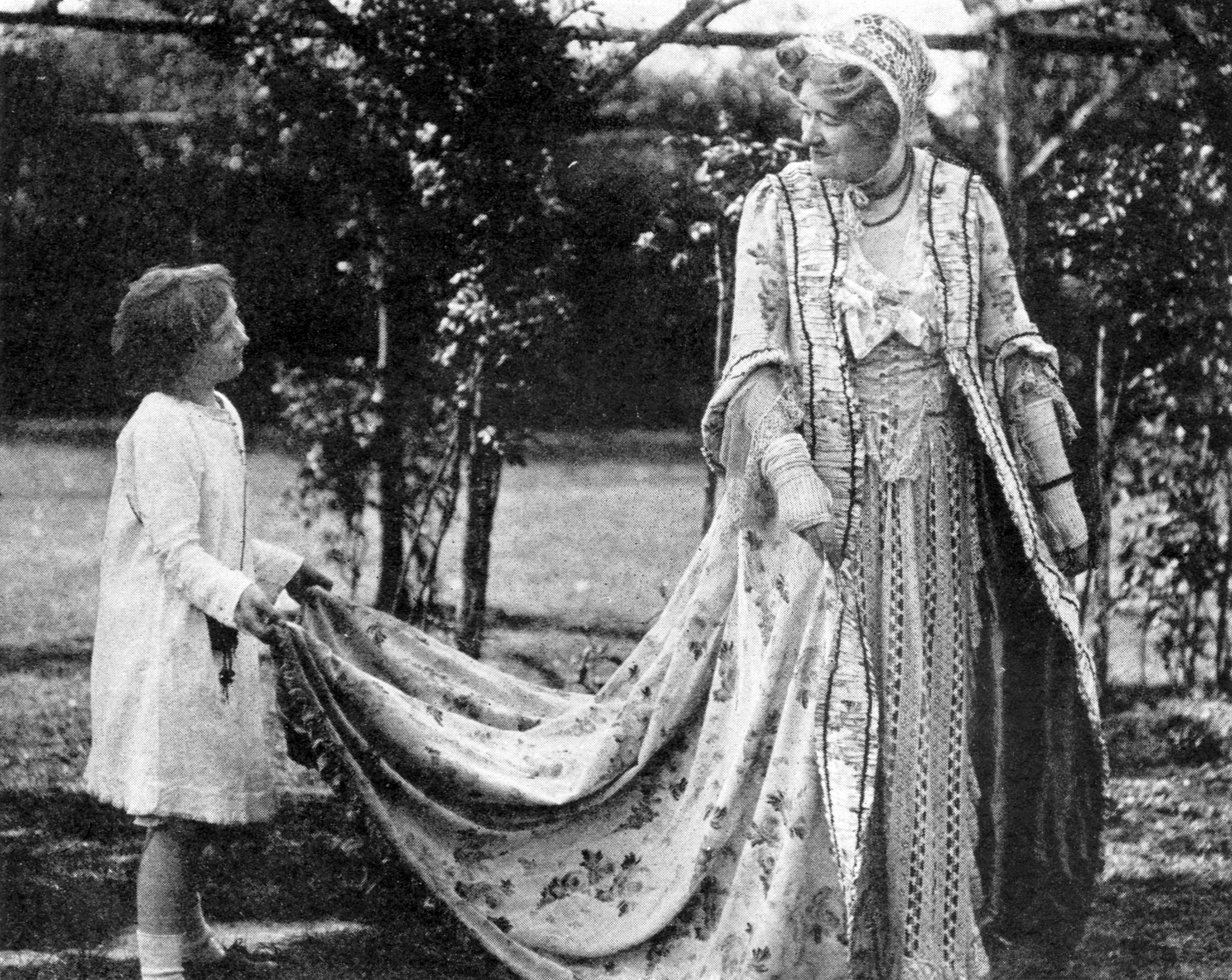
In her garden with granddaughter Nelly Gordon, c. 1918.

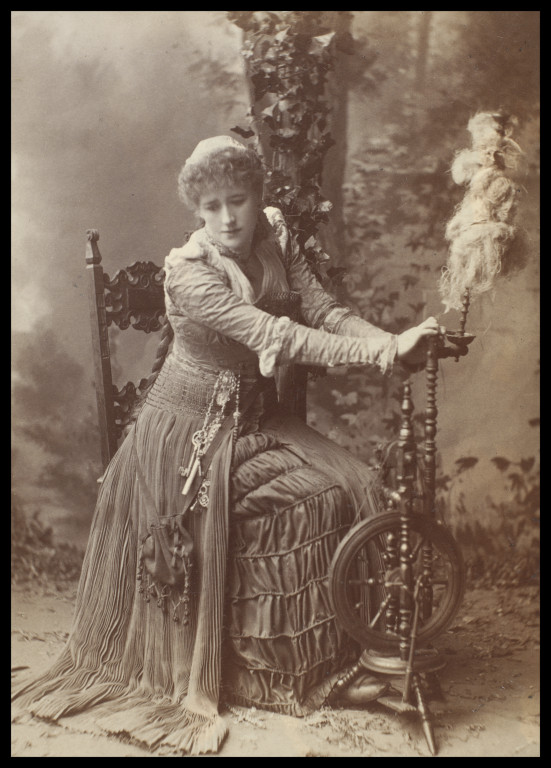
Terry as Margaret in Faust, Lyceum Theatre, 1885

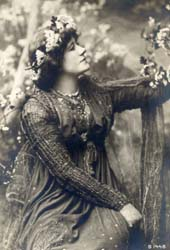
As Guinevere in King Arthur (1895) by Burne-Jones.

== See also ==
- Neilson–Terry Guild of Dramatic Art
- Terry family

== Sources ==
- Chisholm, Hugh, ed. (1911). "Terry, Ellen Alicia" . Encyclopædia Britannica. Vol. 26 (11th ed.). Cambridge University Press. p. 660.
- Cockin, Katharine. Edith Craig (1869–1947): Dramatic Lives (1998) Cassell.
- Cockin, Katharine (2001). Women and Theatre in the Age of Suffrage: The Pioneers Players 1911–25. Basingstoke: Palgrave. ISBN 0333686969.
- Cockin, Katherine (ed.) The Collected Letters of Ellen Terry, Vol. 6, London: Pickering & Chatto (2015) ISBN 9781851961504
- Gielgud, John. An Actor and His Time, Sidgwick and Jackson, London, 1979. ISBN 0-283-98573-9
- Hartnoll, Phyllis and Peter Found, The Concise Oxford Companion to the Theatre. (1992) Oxford University Press ISBN 0-19-866136-3
- Holroyd, Michael. A Strange Eventful History, Farrar Straus Giroux, 2008. ISBN 0-7011-7987-2
- Looser, Devoney (2017). The Making of Jane Austen. Baltimore, Maryland: Johns Hopkins University Press. ISBN 978-1421422824.
- McDonald, Russ. Look to the Lady: Sarah Siddons, Ellen Terry, and Judi Dench on the Shakespearean Stage, University of Georgia Press (2005) ISBN 978-0820325064
- Steen, Marguerite (1962). A Pride of Terrys – A Family Saga. London: Longmans. OCLC 1443983.

Biographies and correspondence

- Auerbach, Nina. Ellen Terry: Player in Her Time (1987) W. W. Norton; (1997) University of Pennsylvania Press ISBN 978-0-8122-1613-4
- Cheshire, David F. Portrait of Ellen Terry (1989) Amber Lane Press, ISBN 0-906399-93-9
- Cockin, Katharine (ed). The Collected Letters of Ellen Terry (2010–2017; 8 volumes) London: Pickering & Chatto.
- Cockin, Katharine (ed.) Ellen Terry, Spheres of Influence (2011) Pickering & Chatto.
- Cockin, Katharine (ed.) Ellen Terry: Lives of the Shakespearian Actors (2012) Pickering & Chatto.
- St. John, Christopher (ed.) Ellen Terry and Bernard Shaw: A Correspondence (1931); and The Shaw-Terry Letters: A Romantic Correspondence
- Coleridge, Stephen (ed.) The Heart of Ellen Terry (1928), London; Mills & Boon, Ltd.
- Fecher, Constance. Bright Star: a Portrait of Ellen Terry (1970)
- Foulkes, Richard ed. Henry Irving: A Re-evaluation, (2008) London: Ashgate.
- Goodman, Jennifer R. "The Last of Avalon: Henry Irving's King Arthur of 1895", Harvard Library Bulletin, 32.3 (Summer 1984) pp. 239–55.
- Hiatt, C. Ellen Terry and her Impersonations (1908)
- Manvell, Roger. Ellen Terry. New York: G. P. Putnam's Sons, 1968.
- Melville, Joy. Ellen and Edy. London: Pandora, 1987.
- Pemberton, Thomas Edgar. Ellen Terry and Her Sisters, London: C.A. Pearson (1902)
- Prideaux, Tom. Love or Nothing: The Life and Times of Ellen Terry (1976) Scribner.
- Scott, Clement. Ellen Terry (1900) New York: Frederick A. Stokes Company, 1900.
- Shearer, Moira (1999). Ellen Terry. Phoenix Mill: Sutton Publishing. ISBN 0-7509-1526-9.
- St John, Christopher. Ellen Terry (1907)
- Stoker, Bram. Personal Reminiscences of Henry Irving, 2 vols. (1906)
- Stokes, John, Michael R. Booth & Susan Bassnett. Bernhardt, Terry, Duse: The Actress in Her Time. Cambridge University Press, 1988.
- The Story of My Life by Ellen Terry at Project Gutenberg (1908) London: Hutchinson & Co; (1982) Schocken Books
