= Small Hythe =

Hamlet in Kent, England

Coordinates: 51.0414°N 0.6994°E

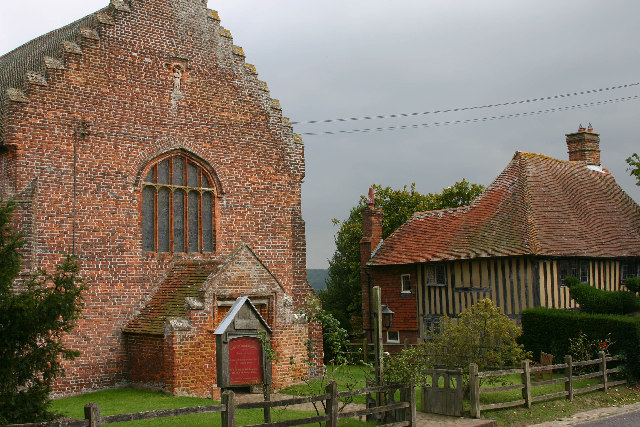
- St John's Church

- Location within Kent
- OS grid reference: TQ893302
- Civil parish: Tenterden
- District: Ashford
- Shire county: Kent
- Region: South East
- Country: England
- Sovereign state: United Kingdom
- Post town: Tenterden
- Postcode district: TN30
- Police: Kent
- Fire: Kent
- Ambulance: South East Coast
- UK Parliament: Weald of Kent

Small Hythe (or Smallhythe) is a hamlet near Tenterden in Kent, England. The population is included in Tenterden.

It stood on a branch of the Rother estuary and was a busy shipbuilding port in the 15th century, before the silting up and draining of the Romney Marshes. Small Hythe's quays and warehouses were destroyed in a fire in 1514 and were never rebuilt.

== History ==
The area of Small Hythe was still on the coast in Roman times. At that time (1st to 3rd Century AD) there was already an important port from which timber and iron were supposedly shipped to the continent, and a small settlement, as evidenced by finds of Roman bricks and an earthen figurine of Mercury that were excavated there.

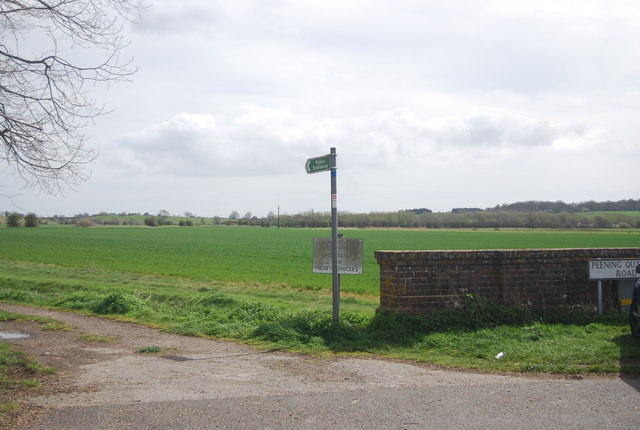
This broad expanse of farmland was once an estuary and the location of an important ferry crossing to the Isle of Oxney (the rising land in the background)

Small Hythe was within the medieval hundred of Tenterden, which does not appear to have existed at the time of the Domesday Book. It is first mentioned in about 1300 and received a charter in 1449 from Henry VI.

Small Hythe lay on a branch of the River Rother. The settlement was made accessible to seagoing craft in the 1330s when the Knelle dam—an earthen bank at Wittersham Levels in the lower Rother valley (grid reference TQ 852 269) constructed to deflect floodwater from the holdings of local landowner Geoffrey de Knelle—diverted the main course of the river around the north of Oxney island. Large sea-going warships were built on the river banks from the fourteenth to the sixteenth centuries, with associated ship-breaking for reuse of fittings and timber. The ready supply of timber from the Weald made this isolated community one of the most important shipbuilding centres, other than the major ports, in the country.

The town of Tenterden was given the status of a Limb of the Cinque Ports, with its consequent relief from taxation, in acknowledgement of providing royal warships built in Small Hythe. A storm of 1636 carried away the dam and the river returned to its former course. Small craft were still able to reach Small Hythe until gradual silting put an end to this, early in the twentieth century.

Small Hythe appears as "Smalide" in the legal dispute about land in Tenterden and Small Hythe in 1460, and as "Smallitt" in the eighteenth century.

== Notable residents ==
Robert Brigandyne (or Brickenden), Keeper of the King's Ships to both Henry VII and Henry VIII, was the supervisor of the construction of Mary Rose, Peter Pomegranate and Great Harry. He lived and worked at the Priest's House, Small Hythe. Actress Ellen Terry lived at Smallhythe Place between 1899 and her death in 1928. It is now managed by the National Trust and houses her collection of theatrical memorabilia and a small theatre.

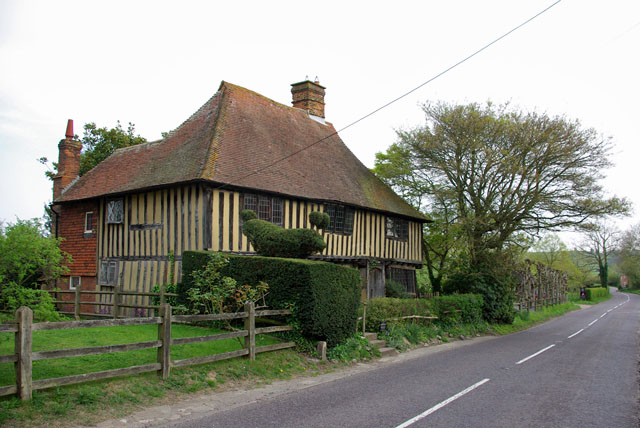
Priest's House

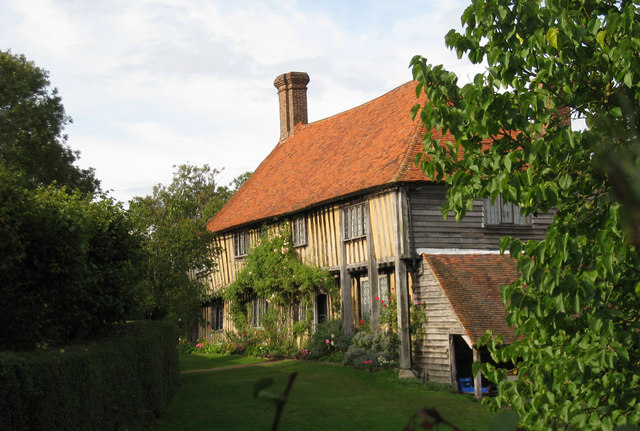
Smallhythe Place
