= Purcell Operatic Society =

Gordon Craig's costume design for the Purcell Operatic Society's 1902 production of Acis and Galatea

The Purcell Operatic Society was a short-lived but influential London opera company devoted to the production of stage works by Henry Purcell and his contemporaries. It was founded in 1899 by the composer Martin Shaw and folded in 1902. Its stage director and production designer was Gordon Craig whose productions for the company marked the beginning of his career as a theatre practitioner. Their debut production of Purcell's opera Dido and Aeneas in 1900 was one of the earliest staged performances of the work in modern times.

== History ==
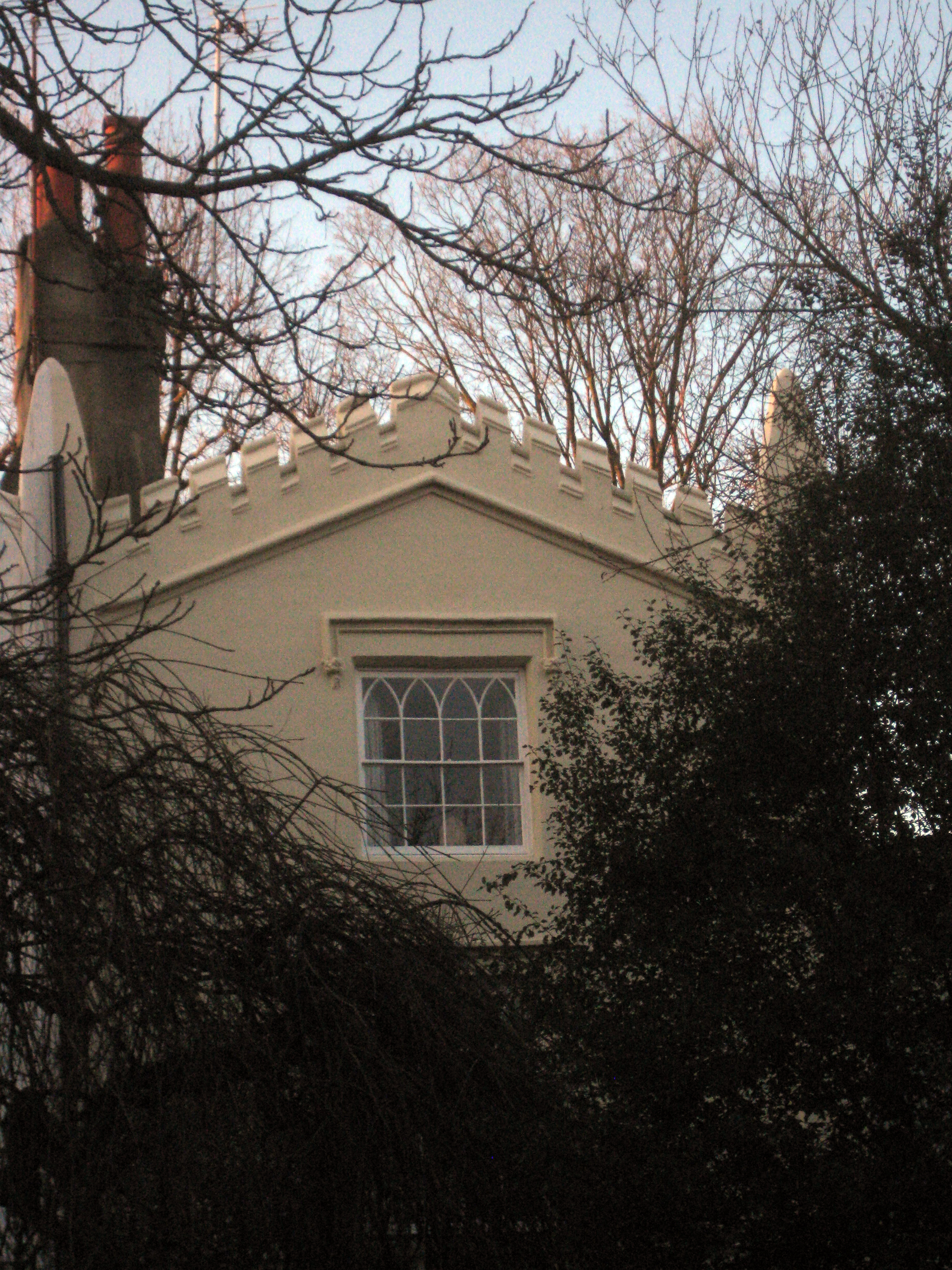
The house at 8 Downshire Hill, Hampstead, which was the Purcell Operatic Society's headquarters

Martin Shaw founded the Purcell Operatic Society in 1899 on the suggestion of his Hampstead neighbour, Nannie Dryhurst, who became the Society's secretary. Interest in Purcell's long-neglected stage works had been revived four years earlier on the bicentenary of his death when Dido and Aeneas received its first major staging in almost two hundred years. Shaw recruited his close friend, Gordon Craig, to create a new staging of the opera for the Society's debut production. Both men were in their mid-twenties at the time, and it was to be Craig's first major outing as a stage director. Craig and Shaw decided to rent lodgings closer to Nannie Dryhurst while they prepared their first production, and moved into a house at 8 Downshire Hill which was to serve as their living quarters, studio, and the offices of the Purcell Operatic Society.

To pay the initial rent on the Downshire Hill house, Shaw sold many of his books and Craig pawned the gold watch which Henry Irving had given him. From the outset, the Society was run on a shoe-string using gifted amateur musicians and singers (75 in all), recruited from Martin Shaw and Nannie Dryhurst's Hampstead friends, supplemented by two professionals for the leads. Shaw arranged the scores, rehearsed and trained the singers and conducted all the productions. Craig not only designed and directed all the productions, he also produced and illustrated the programmes and designed the Society's stationery and posters. Neither of them took any pay. Craig's sister, Edith Craig, also worked on their productions as did the painter Jean Inglis and the scenic artist William Thompson Hemsley. Rehearsals took place in private houses in Hampstead, first in a large room in Guyon House lent to them by William Boulting, and later at Lested Lodge in Well Walk.

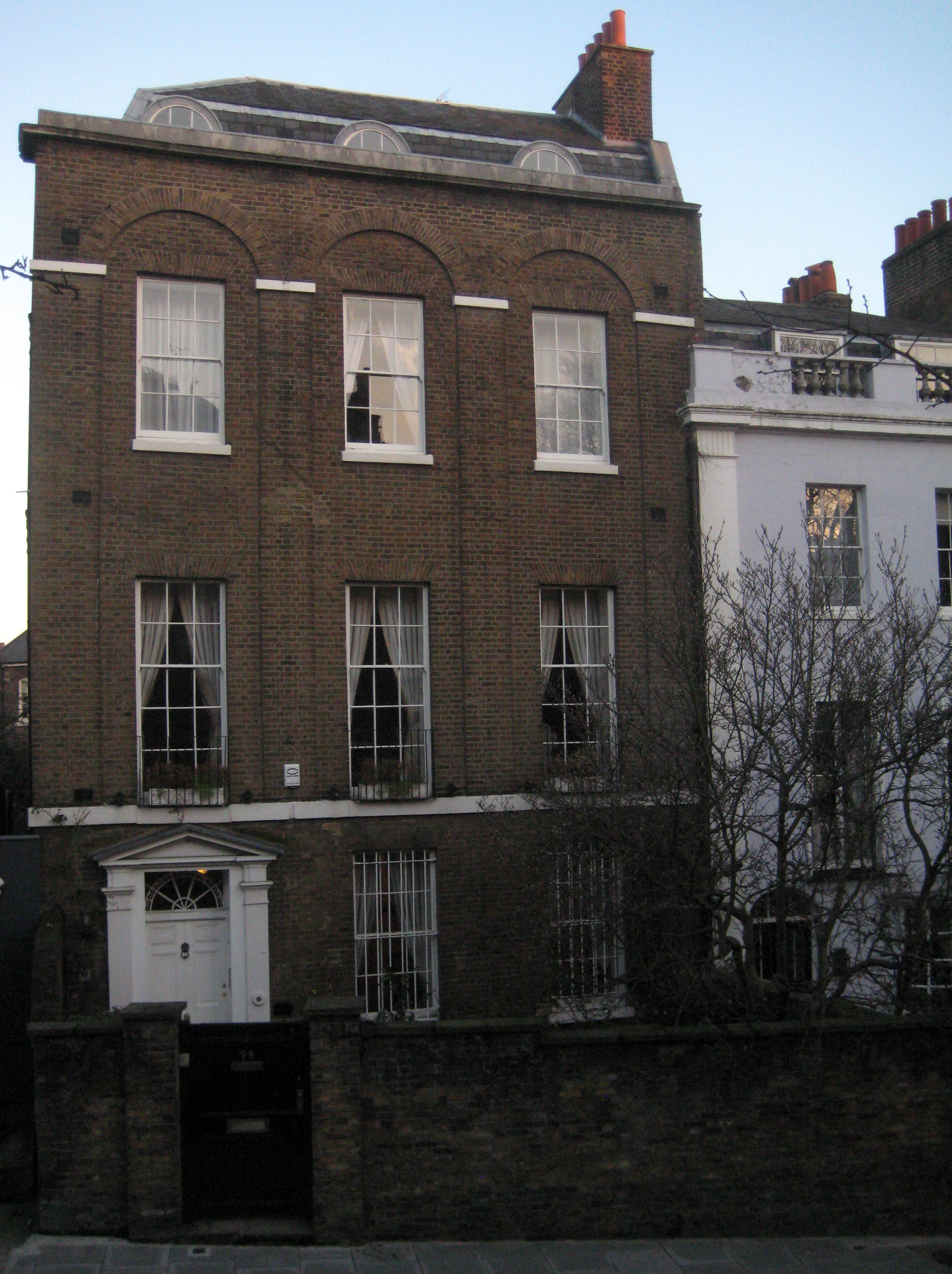
Guyon House in Hampstead where the first rehearsals of Dido and Aeneas took place

Dido and Aeneas opened at the Hampstead Conservatoire on 17 May 1900, to critical success but a financial loss of £180 for the three performance run. Friends made up the shortfall, and the company staged the work again the following year at the Coronet Theatre in Notting Hill. It ran there from 25 to 30 March 1901, along with the Society's new production of The Masque of Love from Purcell's semi-opera, Dioclesian. To help pull in audiences, Ellen Terry, Craig's mother, also performed Charles Reade's one-act play Nance Oldfield as a curtain raiser. However, reviews criticised the addition of the play which had no obvious connection with the other two works and made the evening very long. Much of the audience had left before The Masque of Love even started. Despite the criticism, Craig approached Lillie Langtry to provide a similar curtain raiser for their next production, but after showing initial interest in the proposal, she declined.

The company's third and last production was Handel's Acis and Galatea (performed with The Masque of Love) which opened at the Great Queen Street Theatre on 10 March 1902. Shaw had convinced the theatre's owner, W. S. Penley, to let them rent it for only £40 a week. Nevertheless, the production's finances were precarious. The 1901 Dido and Aeneas revival had not made any profit, and Acis and Galatea had no working capital apart from two or three small donations from friends, including one of £10 from Walter Crane. With insufficient money to pay the stage hands and other creditors, the planned two-week run had to be curtailed to six performances. According to Craig, the creditors' agents called at the theatre on the last night to ensure that no property was removed and even searched the bags of the chorus members as they left. Ellen Terry eventually paid the outstanding bills, but the Purcell Operatic Society was essentially bankrupt, and with no funds forthcoming for future productions, finally had to close down.

In July 1902, Shaw and Craig had already started work on the Society's fourth production, a masque entitled Harvest Home, which was to incorporate both English folk songs and songs by Purcell. However, the project was abandoned when the Society folded. After the Purcell Operatic Society's demise, Shaw and Craig went on to collaborate on three other productions, all with Craig as designer/stage director and Shaw as music director:

- Laurence Housman's nativity play Bethlehem (Great Hall of the Imperial Institute, December 1902)
- Ibsen's The Vikings at Helgeland (Imperial Theatre, April 1903)
- Shakespeare's Much Ado About Nothing (Imperial Theatre, May 1903).

The Vikings and Much Ado About Nothing, both of which starred Ellen Terry and had incidental music composed by Martin Shaw, were commercial disasters and proved to be the last plays Craig ever directed in England.

== Productions ==
Work(s) performed	Theatre	Date
Dido and Aeneas	Hampstead Conservatoire, London	1900 (17 May 18, 19)
Dido and Aeneas †; The Masque of Love	Coronet Theatre, London	1901 (26 March 27, 28, 30 + one matinee)
The Masque of Love; Acis and Galatea	Great Queen Street Theatre, London	1902 (10 March, with five more evening performances + one matinee)
Harvest Home, a masque	unperformed	(preparation work begun in July 1902)

† The programme began with Nance Oldfield performed by Ellen Terry's company

== Members ==
The following were the Honorary and General committee members listed in the programme for the 1900 performance of Dido and Aeneas:

Honorary Members

- Miss Janet Achurch
- Mrs Allingham
- Miss Ellen Terry
- Sir Walter Besant
- Sir J.F. Bridge, Mus. Doc
- Charles Charrington
- Walter Crane
- W.H. Cummings
- Arnold Dolmetsch
- Henry Holiday
- Sir A C. Mackenzie, Mus. Doc.
- Sir G. Martin, Mus. Doc.
- Hamish MacCunn
- Sir Hubert Parry, Mus. Doc.
- A. Schulz-Curtius
- Churchill Sibley
- Prof. Charles Villiers Stanford, Mus. Doc.
- Hamo Thornycroft, R.A.
- Charles Wood, Mus. Doc.

General Committee

- Mrs Boulting, Hon. Sec.
- Mrs Oswald Cox
- Mrs A.R. Dryhurst
- Rev. Dr. E.A. Abbot
- Canon Barnett
- Edward Bell F.S.A.
- Rev. S.B. Burnaby
- J. Spencer Curwen
- Charles Woodward, Hon Treas.
- J. H. Isaacs
- Rev. J. Kirkman
- Dr. W. Mallam
- James Nolan
- Frank Podmore
- James Shaw
- Dr. G. Danford Thomas
- Johnston Watson

== Sources ==
- Burden, Michael (2004) "Purcell's operas on Craig's stage: the productions of the Purcell Operatic Society", Early Music, Vol. 32, Issue 3, August 2004, pp. 442–458
- Carrick, Edward (1968). Gordon Craig: The Story of his Life. Knopf
- Chamberlain, Franc (2008). "Introduction" to Craig, Edward Gordon. On the art of the theatre. Taylor & Francis (first published in 1911), pp. vii–xvi. ISBN 0-415-45033-0
- Eynat-Confino, Irène (1987). Beyond the mask: Gordon Craig, movement, and the actor. SIU Press. ISBN 0-8093-1372-3
- Fisher, James (2009). "'An Idealist': The Legacy of Edward Gordon Craig’s Formative Productions, 1900–1903", Theatre Arts Journal: Studies in Scenography and Performance, Vol. 1, No. 1. ISSN 2076-667X
- Housman, Laurence (1937). The Unexpected Years. Jonathan Cape.
- John, Angela V. (2006). War, journalism and the shaping of the twentieth century: the life and times of Henry W. Nevinson. I.B.Tauris. ISBN 1-84511-081-1
- Nicoll, Allardyce (2009). English Drama, 1900–1930: The Beginnings of the Modern Period. Jones & Bartlett Learning. ISBN 0-521-12947-8
- Roose-Evans, James (1989). Experimental theatre: from Stanislavsky to Peter Brook. Routledge. ISBN 0-415-00963-4
- Shaw, Martin (1929). Up to Now. Oxford University Press.
- Shaw, Martin and Craig, Edward Gordon (1902). Souvenir Acis and Galatea, Masque of Love. J J Waddington.
- Woodfield, James (1984). British theatre in transition, 1889–1914. Rowman & Littlefield (file copy). ISBN 0-389-20483-8
- Yeats, William Butler (1994). The Collected Letters of W.B. Yeats: 1901–1904 (edited and annotated by John Kelly, Eric Domville, and Ronald Schuchard). Oxford University Press. ISBN 0-19-812683-2
