= Up to Now (autobiography) =

1929 autobiography by Martin Shaw

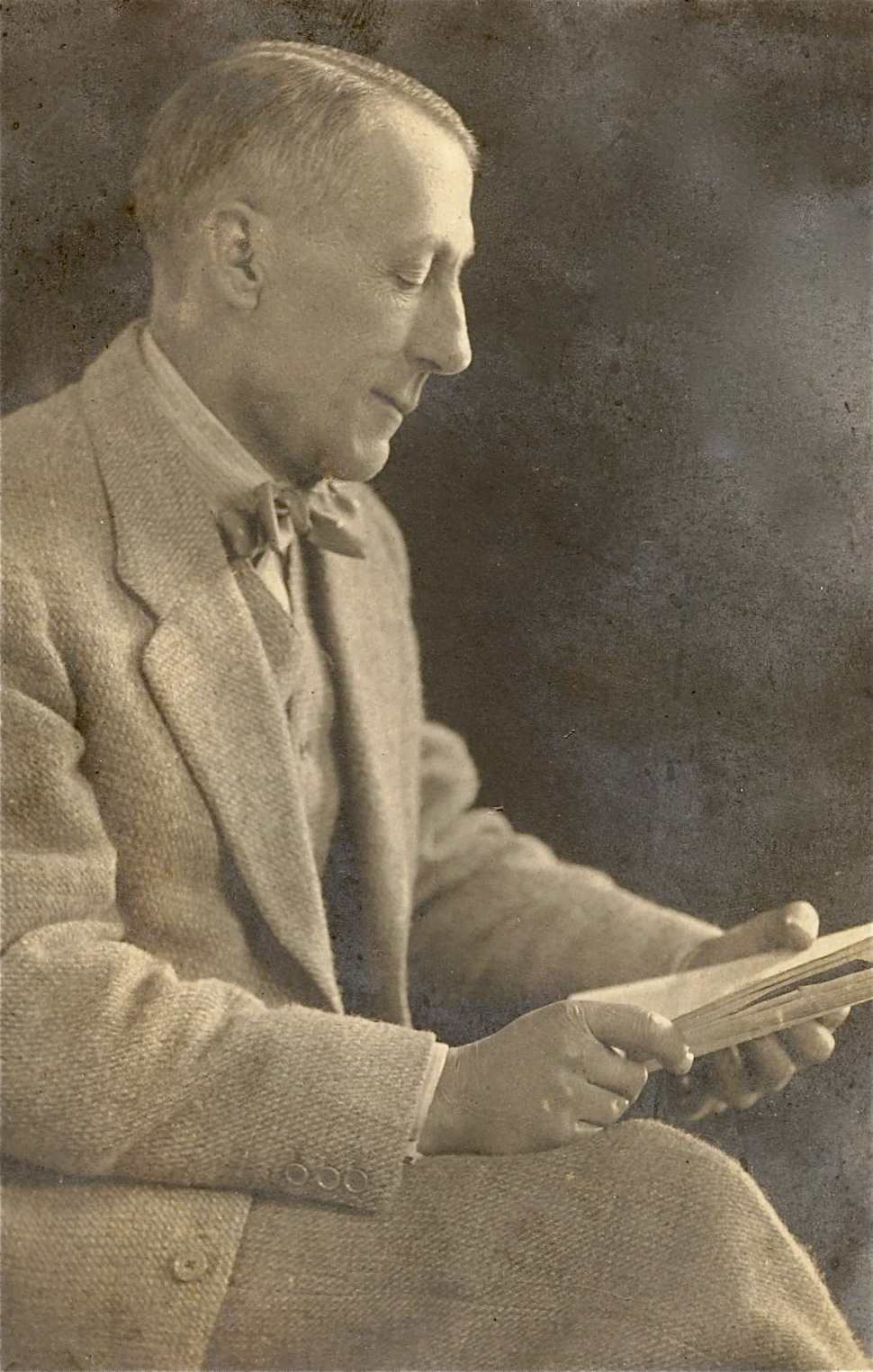
- Portrait of Martin Shaw from a series of photographs taken for the frontispiece of Up to Now
- Author: Martin Shaw
- Genre: Autobiography
- Publisher: Oxford University Press
- Publication date: 1929
- Publication place: United Kingdom
- Media type: Hardback
- Pages: 218
- OCLC: 1377968

Up to Now is the autobiography of the British composer, conductor and theatre producer Martin Shaw (1875–1958). It was published by Oxford University Press in 1929, when Shaw was 53. His reminiscences cover the early period of his life, his family and upbringing, his early career working with Gordon Craig, Isadora Duncan and Ellen Terry, his marriage, and the development of his work in church music, especially his collaborations with Percy Dearmer and Ralph Vaughan Williams. The book contains many anecdotes, largely about Shaw's friends and colleagues in the theatre and music world but also ones relating to other prominent figures such as the British statesman Viscount Grey.

Shaw's book was the first of two autobiographies published in 1929 with the title Up to Now. The second was by the American politician and four-time Governor of New York, Al Smith. As The Times Literary Supplement pointed out, the title promised more to come, but although Shaw lived on for another thirty years, he never published a sequel. In the late 20th and early 21st centuries, Up to Now continued to be used as a source for biographical works on Gordon Craig, Isadora Duncan and Ellen Terry. Eighty years after its publication, the author's grandson, theatre director Robert Shaw, adapted Up To Now as a 45-minute monologue which was performed at the 2010 Edinburgh Festival Fringe.

== Critical reception ==
Percy Scholes writing in The Oxford Companion to Music, called Up to Now "one of the few books of musical reminiscences possessing literary quality." The Musical Times review began with: "We took up this book with misgiving, feeling somehow that Mr. Shaw was too young to be writing an autobiography. We laid it down (at an hour when we ought to have been asleep) wishing there were lots more of it." The reviewer in Theatre Arts Monthly described Shaw's book as "an entertaining little autobiography, ambling and inconsequent, full of revealing anecdotes", and found the chapters on Gordon Craig and Isadora Duncan the most valuable. The Times Literary Supplement pronounced it "a commendable book of gossip" and likewise praised the anecdotes as well as Shaw's affectionate account of his childhood in Hampstead.
