= The Mask (journal) =

Magazine

The Mask was a theatrical magazine published by Edward Gordon Craig from 1908 to 1921. Initially it was published monthly, but soon became quarterly. There were eighty seven issues in total.
