= Mabel Dearmer =

British writer and illustrator

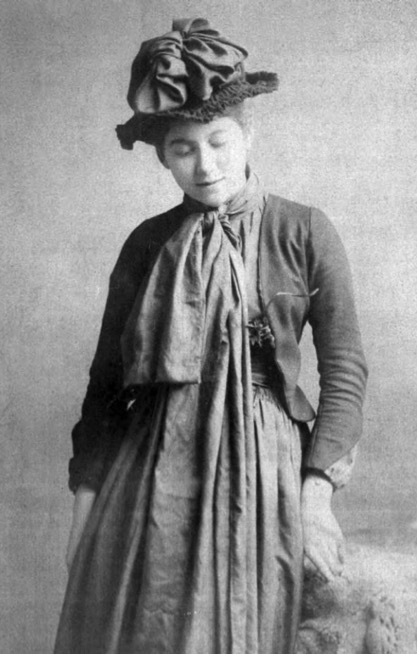
- Dearmer in 1890
- Born: Mabel White; 22 March 1872
- Died: 15 July 1915 (aged 43); Kingdom of Serbia
- Cause of death: typhoid
- Occupation: Illustrator
- Spouse: Percy Dearmer
- Children: 2, including Geoffrey

Jessie Mabel Pritchard Dearmer (née White; 22 March 1872 – 15 July 1915) was an English novelist, dramatist and children's book author/illustrator. She was a committed pacifist who died while caring for the war wounded in Serbia.

== Early life ==
Born Jessie Mabel Pritchard White, the daughter of surgeon-major William White and Selina Taylor Pritchard, she was educated in London and was trained by W. G. Wills. She entered Hubert von Herkomer's art school in 1891, but left the following year to marry the socialist liturgist priest Percy Dearmer.

== Writing career ==
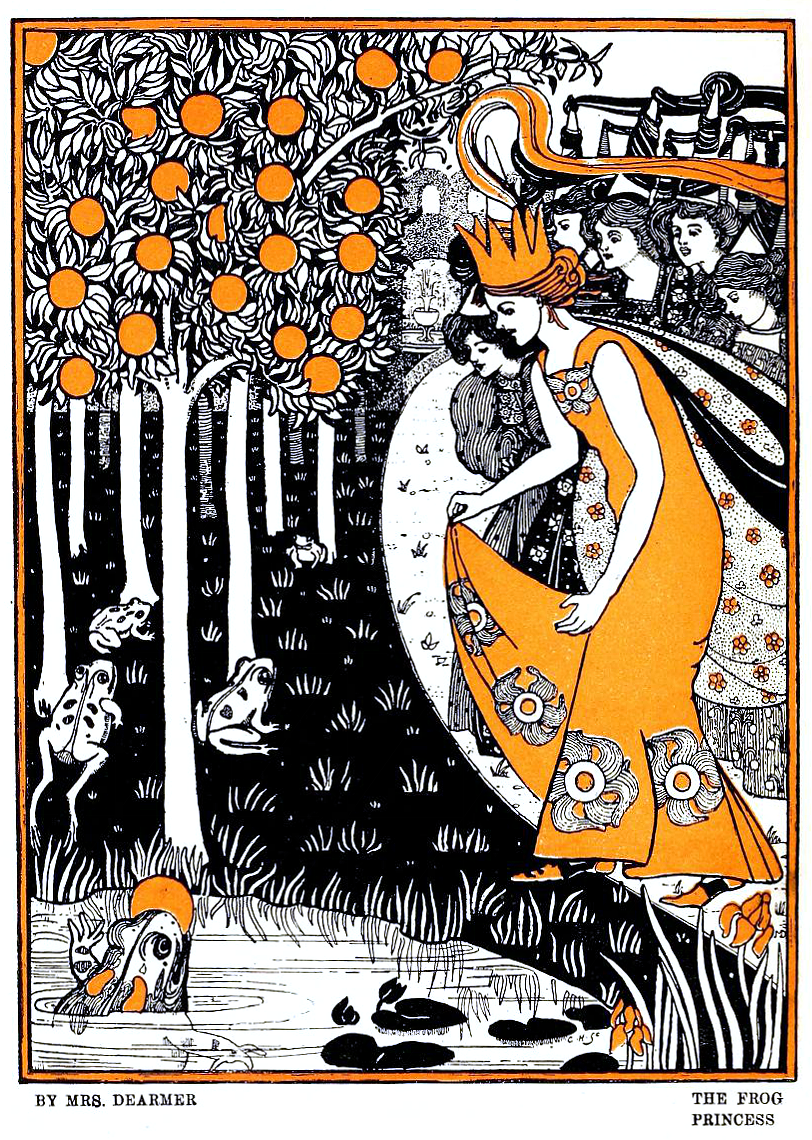
The Frog Princess "by Mrs Percy Dearmer"

In 1896, she began contributing illustrations to The Yellow Book, The Savoy and The Studio. She notable created the cover for the Yellow Book's issue number nine. She soon after turned to children's book illustration. Dearmer created artwork for Wymps, and Other Fairy Tales and All the Way to Fairyland by Evelyn Sharp and The Story of the Seven Young Goslings by Laurence Housman (1899). She also illustrated several self-written titles, Round-about Rhymes (1898), The Book of Penny Toys (1899), and The Noah’s Ark Geography (1900).

From 1902, Dearmer began writing for adults, beginning with The Noisy Years and its 1906 sequel Brownjohn’s. Her autobiography The Difficult Way was published in 1905, and other titles include a historical romance The Orangery: A Comedy of Tears (1904), The Alien Sisters (1908), and Gervase 1909. A keen dramatist, in 1911 she founded the Morality Play Society, which performed productions of her plays The Soul of the World and The Dreamer.

Dearmer accompanied her husband when he volunteered as a chaplain to the British Red Cross. Although a committed pacifist, she joined the Third Serbian Relief Unit as a nursing orderly. She left for Serbia in April 1915, but contracted enteric fever (typhoid) in June, and died of pneumonia on 15 July. Her letters of that time were, with a memoir by Stephen Gwynn, posthumously published as Letters from a field hospital (1915).

Three months after her death, her younger son Christopher, a Royal Navy pilot was killed after 10 days of active service in the Dardanelles in October 1915 in the Gallipoli Campaign. Her elder son Geoffrey Dearmer survived to the age of 103. After serving in the Army at Gallipoli in World War I, he wrote war poetry, and continued as an English ruralist poet and novelist. In the 1930s, he joined the BBC, working in a combination of radio and church music, and became a founding force in “Children’s Hour”.

== Works ==
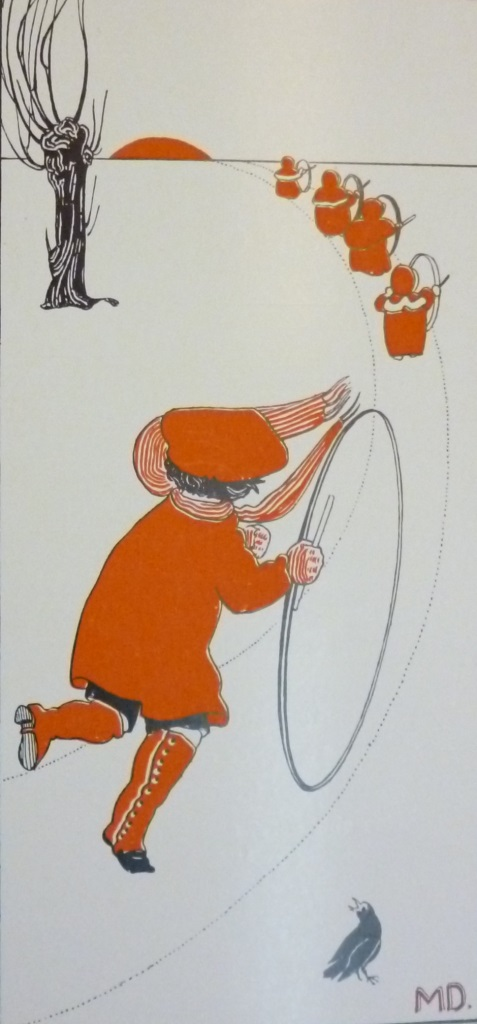
Round-about Rhymes by "Mrs. Percy Dearmer"

- Roundabout Rhymes (1898)
- The Book of Penny Toys (1899)
- Noah's Ark Geography (1900), also known as The Cockyolly Bird and A Noah’s Ark Geography. A True Account of the Travels and Adventures of Kit, Jum-Jum and the Cockyolly Bird, faithfully set forth and pictured by Mabel Dearmer.
- The Noisy Years (1903)
- The Orangery: A Comedy of Tears. London: Smith, Elder, & Company. 1904.
- The Difficult Way (1905)
- Brownjohn's (1906)
- A Child's Life of Christ (1907)
- The Alien Sisters (1908)
- The Sisters. New York: McClure Company. 1908.
- Gervase (1909)
- Nan Pilgrim (1909)
- The Soul of the World: A Mystery Play (1911)
- The Dreamer: A Poetic Drama (1912)
- The Cockyolly Bird (1913: produced in London, with music and dance)
- Brer Rabbit and Mr. Fox. London: Joseph Williams. 1914. with Martin Shaw
- The Cockyolly Bird: A Book of the Play (1914)
