= The Parson's Handbook =

1899 non-fiction book by Percy Dearmer

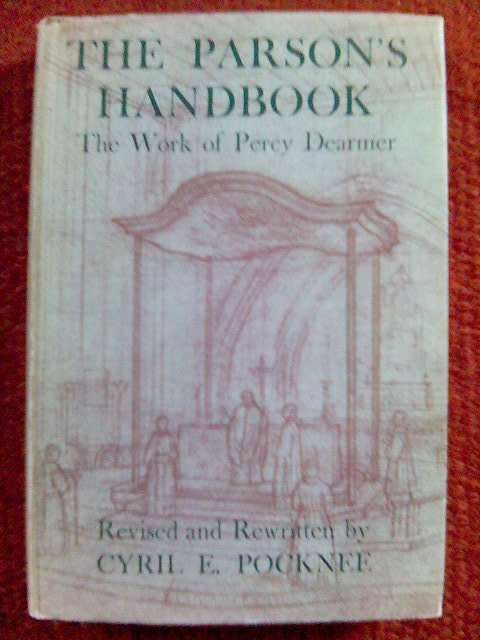
The dust-jacket cover of the 13th revised edition of The Parson's Handbook by Percy Dearmer. This edition was heavily revised and rewritten by Dearmer's pupil Cyril Pocknee.

The Parson's Handbook is a book by Percy Dearmer, first published in 1899, that was fundamental to the development of liturgy in the Church of England and throughout the Anglican Communion.

When he wrote the book, Dearmer was an assistant priest at the Berkeley Chapel in Mayfair.

The 19th-century Oxford Movement brought the high church within the Church of England into a place of confident leadership of the mainstream of the church. By the end of that century, many were struggling to find suitable forms of worship that were at once obedient to the letter of the Book of Common Prayer (if not its intention) and reflected the desire to a return to more Catholic forms of ritual and ceremonial. Some in the church took on board much of the ritual of the Tridentine Mass. Dearmer and other members of the Alcuin Club decried this wholesale adaptation of Italianate forms, and they campaigned for a revived English Catholicism that was rooted in pre-Reformation ritual, especially in the Sarum Use – something they termed the Anglican Use or English Use. The Parson's Handbook is Dearmer's brotherly advice to fellow churchmen about the correct way to conduct proper and fitting English worship. Dearmer's writing style is strong: he disparages customs he finds quaint or misguided, and makes good use of his subtle wit. Although Dearmer's directions would have originally been considered high church, the popularity of the handbook has made them normative. This norm has been influential throughout those portions of the Anglican Communion that have been open to the development of a more Catholic ritual.

The handbook was first published by Grant Richards in 1899. Oxford University Press published their first edition in 1907. The twelfth edition was published in 1932, four years before Dearmer's death. The final, 13th edition of 1965 was extensively revised and rewritten by Cyril Pocknee, a former pupil of Dearmer's.

== Chapter headings ==
The chapter headings according to the 13th revised edition are:

1. Some Liturgical Principles
2. The Christian Altar and its Furnishings
3. The Chancel and Nave and their Furniture
4. Vestments and Vesture, including Episcopal Insignia and Liturgical Colours
5. The Ornaments of the Church
6. Vestries
7. Matins and Evensong
8. Processions, including the use of the Litany
9. The Holy Communion: (1) Introduction
10. The Holy Communion: (2) Solemn Eucharist or High Mass
11. The Holy Communion: (3) Priest and Clerk; a plain Celebration
12. The Rites of Christian Initiation: Baptism, Confirmation, and First Communion
13. The Solemnization of Holy Matrimony and the Churching of Women
14. The Visitation, Anointing, and Communion of the Sick
15. The Burial of the Dead, including Memorials to the Departed
16. Notes on the Seasons
17. The Parish Meeting and the Parish Breakfast
- Appendix I: Collects for Use in Processions and on other Occasions
- Appendix II: New and Revised Canons (1964): Section G, Things Appertaining to Churches

== See also ==
- Anglo-Catholicism
