= Dagny (name) =

Dagny is a Scandinavian feminine given name of Norwegian origin. Alternate forms include Dagna, Dagne and the Latvian form Dagnija.

It is derived from the combination of the Old Norse words dagr 'day' and ný 'new'. While appearing in Norse mythology, it had virtually fallen out of use for centuries, and was revived at the second half of the 19th century. This is attributed either to a character of that name in Henrik Ibsen’s 1857 play "The Vikings of Helgeland" or more likely to the popularity of Dagny, a Scandinavian women's magazine founded in 1886. The name was at its most common in Scandinavia in the early to mid 20th century.

Notable people with the name include:

- Dagný Brynjarsdóttir, Icelandic soccer player
- Dagny Carlsson, Swedish blogger
- Dagny Hald, Norwegian ceramist and illustrator
- Dagny Haraldsen, mother of Queen Sonja of Norway
- Dagny Hultgreen, American TV personality of Norwegian heritage
- Dagny Jørgensen, Norwegian alpine skier
- Dagny Johnson, American environmentalist activist in Florida
- Dagny Juel, Norwegian writer
- Dagny Knutson, American swimmer of Norwegian heritage
- Dagny Lind, Swedish film actress
- Dagny Mellgren, Norwegian footballer
- Dagny Norvoll Sandvik, Norwegian vocalist
- Dagny Servaes (1894–1961), German-Austrian actress
- Dagný Skúladóttir, Icelandic handball player
- Dagnija Staķe, Latvian politician
- Dagny Tande Lid, Norwegian painter, illustrator and poet

== Fictional characters ==
- Dagny, Ørnulv's daughter, fictional character in The Vikings of Helgeland
- Dagny Taggart, fictional character in Ayn Rand's Atlas Shrugged
