= Hampstead Conservatoire =

Coordinates: 51.5442°N 0.1738°W

The Hampstead Conservatoire was a private college for music and the arts at 64, Eton Avenue, Swiss Cottage, London. One of the founders was Florence Ashton Marshall.

The building, previously the Eton Avenue Hall, was reconstructed in 1890. It was equipped with a large pipe organ, built ca. 1887-8 by the London firm of Henry Willis & Sons with forty-three stops spread over four manuals and pedals.

The hey-day of the conservatoire was 1896 - 1905, when its Principal was Cecil Sharp. Arnold Bax was one of its pupils between 1898 and 1900. It was also notable for an early and celebrated production of Dido and Aeneas in 1900 by Martin Shaw and Gordon Craig.

The organ was removed and transferred to St Peter's Parish Church, Brighton in 1910. The conservatoire had closed by 1928 when the building was converted into the Embassy Theatre. The building is now part of the Royal Central School of Speech and Drama
