= Geoffrey Dearmer =

British poet

Geoffrey Dearmer LVO (21 March 1893 – 18 August 1996) was a British poet. He was the son of Anglican liturgist and hymnologist Percy Dearmer and the artist and writer Mabel Dearmer.

== School and university life ==
Stephen Gwynn, a writer closely associated with Dearmer's family, recorded that Dearmer had disliked school but blossomed at university:

I have seen a boy who was consistently and persistently and indomitably unhappy during all the phases of his school life, turn into a creature radiant, walking on air, swimming in felicity, from the moment that he became an undergraduate. Bliss lasted for two years and then there was trouble about exams: but Geoffrey Dearmer – for he is my example – had got as much as anyone I ever knew of the real Oxford teaching, which is given by the atmosphere and surroundings and associations and companionships of the place.

== Service in the First World War ==
Dearmer served first (in 1915) with the Royal Fusiliers at Gallipoli, where his younger brother, Christopher, a pilot with the Royal Naval Air Service, had been recently killed in action, and then with the Royal Army Service Corps on the Western Front in France. Dearmer's mother, Mabel, died in Serbia while serving as a paramedic with a Red Cross ambulance unit, for which her husband, the Revd Percy Dearmer, was acting as chaplain.

Dearmer was appointed a lieutenant of the Royal Victorian Order.

== Civilian career ==
From 1936 to 1958, Dearmer was Examiner of Plays in the Lord Chamberlain's Office. Simultaneously, he served as editor of the BBC radio Children's Hour programme. In this capacity, he wrote the introduction in 1960 for W. R. Dalzell's Living Artists of the Eighteenth Century (Hutchinson & Co., London). In 1935, his sci-fi novel They Chose to Be Birds appeared (Heinemann, London, 1935).

== Legacy ==
He turned 100 in 1993. Dearmer died in 1996 in Birchington, Kent, at the age of 103. The Geoffrey Dearmer Award for new poets was founded in his memory in 1998.

== Poetic works ==
Many of Dearmer's war poems dealt with the overall brutality of war and violence, of which he was a direct eyewitness. These poems enjoyed a brief popularity during and immediately after World War I but were later overshadowed by the starker works of other war poets such as Wilfred Owen and Siegfried Sassoon. Dearmer's poems were never infused with anger or despair and often revealed his unshakable Christian faith.

Night held me as I crawled and scrambled near
The Turkish lines. Above, the mocking stars
Silvered the curving parapet, and clear
Cloud-latticed beams o'erflecked the land with bars
I, crouching, lay between
Tense-listening armies peering through the night,
Twin giants bound by tentacles unseen.
Here in dim-shadowed light
I saw him, as a sudden movement turned
His eyes towards me, glowing eyes that burned
A moment ere his snuffling muzzle found
My trail; and then, as serpents mesmerise,
He chained me with those unrelenting eyes,
That muscle-sliding rhythm, knit and bound
In spare-limbed symmetry, those perfect jaws
And soft-approaching pitter-patter paws.
Nearer and nearer like a wolf he crept—
That moment had my swift revolver leapt—
But terror seized me, terror born of shame
Brought flooding revelation. For he came
As one who offers comradeship deserved,
An open ally of the human race,
And sniffing at my prostrate form unnerved
He licked my face!

— "Turkish Trench Dog"

Dearmer was also a poet of nature. A critic who knew him well rated his garden poetry as highly as his war poems, quoting these lines as an example:

[...] The fields were loud with bees
And drowsy with the wind-stirred meadowsweet.
From bowing trees
Fell chatter, and above the garden wall
Wide sunflowers beamed at spearing hollyhocks
That dared the wind, and scorned the clustered stocks,
And bore their laddered blooms high over all.

— "The Strolling Singer", lines 4-10

== Collections ==
- Poems, 1918
- A Day's Delight, 1923
- A Pilgrim's Song, John Murray, 1993
