= Percy Dearmer =

English cleric and Christian Socialist

The Reverend Canon Percy Dearmer
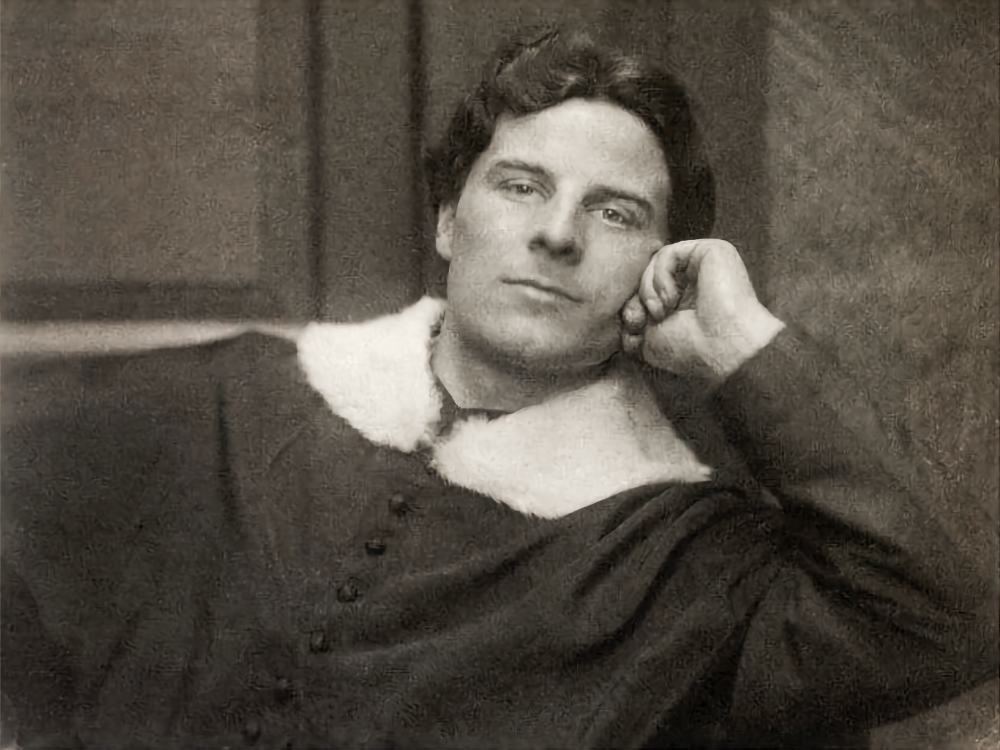
- Born: Percival Dearmer; 27 February 1867; Kilburn, England
- Died: 29 May 1936 (aged 69); Westminster, England
- Notable work: The Parson's Handbook (1899); The English Hymnal (1906); Songs of Praise (1925); The Oxford Book of Carols (1928)
- Spouses: Mabel White (m. 1892; died 1915); Nancy Knowles (m. 1916)

Ecclesiastical career
- Religion: Christianity (Anglican)
- Church: Church of England
- Ordained: 1891 (deacon); 1892 (priest)
- Congregations: St Mary-the-Virgin, Primrose Hill

Academic background
- Education: Christ Church, Oxford
- Influences: Charles Gore; F. D. Maurice; Francis Edward Paget; York Powell; John Ruskin; Thomas Strong

Academic work
- Discipline: Art
- Sub-discipline: Ecclesiastical art; liturgics
- Institutions: King's College, London

Percival Dearmer (27 February 1867 – 29 May 1936) was an English Anglican priest and liturgist best known as the author of The Parson's Handbook, a liturgical manual for Anglican clergy, and as editor of The English Hymnal. A lifelong socialist, he was an early advocate of the public ministry of women (but not their ordination to the priesthood) and concerned with social justice. Dearmer, with Ralph Vaughan Williams and Martin Shaw, helped revive and spread traditional and medieval English musical forms. His ideas on patterns of worship have been linked to the Arts and Crafts Movement, while The English Hymnal reflects both folkloric scholarship and Christian Socialism. At his death, he was a canon of Westminster Abbey, where he ran a canteen for the unemployed.

== Early life and ordination ==
Dearmer was born on 27 February 1867 in Kilburn, Middlesex, to an artistic family; his father, Thomas Dearmer, was an artist and drawing instructor. Dearmer attended Streatham School and Westminster School in the early 1880s, before going to a boarding school in Switzerland. From 1886 to 1889 he studied modern history at Christ Church, Oxford, receiving his Bachelor of Arts degree in 1890. He was associated with Pusey House and acted as secretary to its principal, Charles Gore.

Dearmer was made a deacon in 1891 and ordained to the priesthood in 1892 at Rochester Cathedral. On 26 May that year, he married 19-year-old Mabel White (1872–1915), the daughter of Surgeon-Major William White, a writer (known as Mabel Dearmer) of novels and plays. She died of typhus in 1915 while they were both serving with an ambulance unit in Serbia during the First World War. They had two sons, both of whom served in the First World War. The elder, Geoffrey, lived to the age of 103, one of the oldest surviving war poets. The younger, Christopher, died in 1915 of wounds received in battle in the Dardanelles.

== The Parson's Handbook and incumbent at St Mary's ==
Dearmer's liturgical leanings were the product of a late Victorian debate among advocates of Ritualism in the Church of England. Although theoretically in agreement about a return to more Catholic forms of worship, high-church clergy argued over whether these forms should be appropriated from post-Tridentine Roman Catholic practices or revived from the traditions of pre-Reformation "English Use" rites. Dearmer's views fell very much on the side of the latter.

Active in the burgeoning Alcuin Club, Dearmer became the spokesman for a movement with the publication of his most influential work, The Parson's Handbook. In this work his intention was to establish sound liturgical practices in the native English tradition which were also in full accord with the rites and rubrics of the Book of Common Prayer and the canons that governed its use, and therefore safe from attack by evangelicals who opposed such practices. Such adherence to the letter was considered necessary in an environment in which conservatives such as John Kensit had been leading demonstrations, interruptions of services and legal battles against practices of Ritualism and sacerdotalism, both of which they saw as "popery".

The Parson's Handbook is concerned with general principles of ritual and ceremonial, but the emphasis is squarely on the side of art and beauty in worship. Dearmer states in the introduction that his goal is to help in "remedying the lamentable confusion, lawlessness, and vulgarity which are conspicuous in the Church at this time". His ideas on the pattern and manner of worship have been linked to the influence of John Ruskin, William Morris and others in the Arts and Crafts movement.

In 1901, after serving four curacies, Dearmer was appointed the third vicar of London church St Mary-the-Virgin, Primrose Hill, where he remained until 1915. He used the church as a sort of practical laboratory for the principles he had outlined, revising the book several times during his tenure.

In 1912, Dearmer was instrumental in founding the Warham Guild, a sort of practical expression of the concerns discussed in the Alcuin Club and reflected in The Parson's Handbook, to carry out "the making of all the 'Ornaments of the Church and of the Ministers thereof' according to the standard of the Ornaments Rubric, and under fair conditions of labour". It is an indication of the founders' outlook, emphasis and commitment to the English Use that it was named for the last Archbishop of Canterbury before the break with Rome. Dearmer served as lifelong head of the Warham Guild's advisory committee.

== Hymnology ==
Working with the composer Ralph Vaughan Williams as musical editor, Dearmer published The English Hymnal in 1906. He again worked with Vaughan Williams and Martin Shaw to produce Songs of Praise (1925) and the Oxford Book of Carols (1928). These hymnals have been credited with reintroducing many elements of traditional and medieval English music into the Church of England, as well as carrying that influence well beyond the church, and from a political point of view bearing the imprint of Christian Socialism.

In 1931 an enlarged edition of Songs of Praise was published, notable for the first publication of the hymn "Morning Has Broken", commissioned by Dearmer from noted children's author Eleanor Farjeon. The song, later popularised by Cat Stevens, was written by Farjeon to be sung with the traditional Gaelic tune "Bunessan". Songs of Praise also contained Dearmer's version of "A Great and Mighty Wonder" which mixed John Mason Neale's Greek translation and a translation of the German "Es ist ein Ros entsprungen" from which the music to the hymn had come in 1906.

== Later years ==
Dearmer left St Mary's to serve as a chaplain to the British Red Cross ambulance unit in Serbia, where his wife died of typhus in 1915. In 1916 he worked with YMCA in France and, in 1916 and 1917, with the Mission of Help in India. Dearmer married his second wife, Nancy Knowles, on 19 August 1916. They had two daughters and a son, Antony, who died in Royal Air Force service in 1943.

For fifteen years Dearmer served in no official ecclesiastical posts, preferring instead to focus on his writing, volunteerism and effecting social change. He was created a Companion of the Roll of Honour of the Memorial of Merit of King Charles the Martyr in 1915.

Politically, Dearmer was an avowed socialist, serving as secretary of the Christian Social Union from 1891 to 1912. He underscored these values by including a "Litany of Labour" in his 1930 manual for communicants, The Sanctuary. After being appointed a canon of Westminster Abbey in 1931 he ran a canteen for the unemployed out of it.

Dearmer served as visiting professor at the Berkeley Divinity School in New Haven, Connecticut, in 1918–1919, and then as the first professor of ecclesiastical art at King's College London from 1919 until his death. He died of coronary thrombosis on 29 May 1936, aged sixty-nine, at his residence in Westminster. His ashes were interred in the Great Cloister at Westminster Abbey on 3 June.

== Works written or edited ==
- Christian Socialism and Practical Christianity. London: The Clarion, Ltd., 1897.
- The Parson's Handbook. London: Grant Richards, 1899.
- The Cathedral Church of Wells: A Description of Its Fabric and a Brief History of the Episcopal See. G. Bell and Sons. 1899.
- The Cathedral Church of Oxford: A Description of Its Fabric and a Brief History of the Episcopal See. G. Bell and Sons. 1899.
- The Little Lives of the Saints. London: Wells, Gardner, Darton and Co., 1900. illustrated by Charles Robinson
- Highways and Byways in Normandy. Macmillan, 1900. from the Highways and Byways (series of regional guides)
- The English Liturgy from the Book of Common Prayer 1903.
- Loyalty to the Prayer Book, 1904
- The English Hymnal. 1906. (General editor)
- The Training of a Christian According to the Prayer Book and Canons. London: A. R. Mowbray, 1906.
- Socialism and Christianity. Fabian Tract No 133. London: Fabian Society. 1907.
- The Ornaments of the Ministers. London: A. R. Mowbray. 1908.
- Socialism and Religion. London: A. C. Fifield, 1908.
- The Reform of the Poor Law. London: A. R. Mowbray, 1908.
- Body and Soul: An Enquiry into the Effect of Religion on Health. New York: E. P. Dutton, 1909.
- Everyman's History of the English Church. London: Mowbray, 1909.
- Fifty Pictures of Gothic Altars. London: Longmans, Green & Company. 1910.
- The Church and Social Questions. London: A. R. Mowbray, 1910.
- The Prayer Book: What It Is and How We Should Use It. London: A. R. Mowbray, 1910.
- Reunion and Rome. London: A. R. Mowbray, 1911.
- Is "Ritual" Right? London: A. R. Mowbray, 1911.
- The Dragon of Wessex: A Story of the Days of Alfred. London: A. R. Mowbray; Milwaukee: The Young Churchman Co., 1911.
- Everyman's History of the Prayer Book. London: Mowbray, 1912.
- Illustrations of the Liturgy, being Thirteen Drawings of the Celebration of the Holy Communion in a Parish Church, by Clement O. Skilbeck. Milwaukee: The Young Churchman, 1912.
- The English Carol Book (with Martin Shaw). 1913.
- False Gods. London: A. R. Mowbray, 1914.
- Is "Ritual" Right? London: Mowbray, 1914.
- Monuments and Memorials 1915
- Russia and Britain. Oxford University Press, 1915.
- Patriotism and Fellowship. London: Smith, Elder, 1917.
- The Art of Public Worship. Bohlen Lectures, 1919.
- The English Carol Book (with Martin Shaw), 2nd ed. 1919.
- The Power of the Spirit. Oxford University Press, 1919.
- The Communion of Saints. London: A. R. Mowbray, 1919.
- The Chalice and Paten. London: The Warham Guild, 1920
- The Church at Prayer and the World Outside. London: James Clarke, 1923.
- Eight Preparations for Communion. London: SPCK, 1923.
- Songs of Praise (with Martin Shaw and Ralph Vaughan Williams). Oxford University Press, 1925.
- The Two Duties of a Christian: For the Use of Enquirers and Teachers. Cambridge: W. Heffer and Sons, 1925.
- The Lord's Prayer and the Sacraments: For the Use of Enquirers and Teachers. Cambridge: W. Heffer and Sons, 1925.
- Belief in God and in Jesus Christ. London: SPCK, 1927.
- The Truth about Fasting: With Special Reference to Fasting Communion (PDF). London: Rivingtons. 1928.
- The Sin Obsession. London: E. Benn, 1928.
- The Oxford Book of Carols (with Martin Shaw and Ralph Vaughan Williams). Oxford University Press, 1928.
- The Resurrection, the Spirit, and the Church. Cambridge: W. Heffer, 1928.
- Lecture Notes for Lantern Slides Warham Guild, 1929.
- The Legend of Hell: An Examination of the Idea of Everlasting Punishment. London: Cassell, 1929.
- The Communion Service in History. London: Church Assembly, 1929.
- The Eastern Origins of Christian Art and Their Reaction upon History. London: Sampson Low, Marston and Co., 1929.
- Linen Ornaments of the Church (1929), digitised by Richard Mammana
- The Sanctuary, A Book for Communicants, London: Rivingtons, 1930.
- The Urgency of Church Art: "Spiritual Truth Conveyed by Means of the Outward". London: 1930.
- The Escape from Idolatry. London: Ernest Benn, 1930.
- Some English Altars. Introductory Note by Percy Dearmer. London: Warham Guild, 1930–1944?
- Songs of Praise Enlarged Edition (with Martin Shaw and Ralph Vaughan Williams) Oxford University Press, 1931.
- The Burse and the Corporals (1932)
- The Server's Handbook, 3rd ed. Oxford University Press, 1932.
- Christianity and the Crisis. London: Gollancz, 1933.
- Songs of Praise Discussed, A Handbook to the Best-known Hymns and to Others Recently Introduced (with Archibald Jacob) Oxford University Press 1933
- Our National Church. London: Nisbet and Co., 1934.
- Christianity as a New Religion. London: Lindsey Press, 1935.
- Man and His Maker: Science, Religion and the Old Problems. London: SCM Press, 1936.

== Styles and titles ==
- Mr Percival Dearmer (1867–1891)
- The Revd (or Fr) Percival Dearmer (1891–1911)
- The Revd Dr Percival Dearmer (1911–1931)
- The Revd Canon Percival Dearmer (1931–1936)
