= Edward Gordon Craig =

English actor and director (1872–1966)

Edward Gordon Craig CH OBE
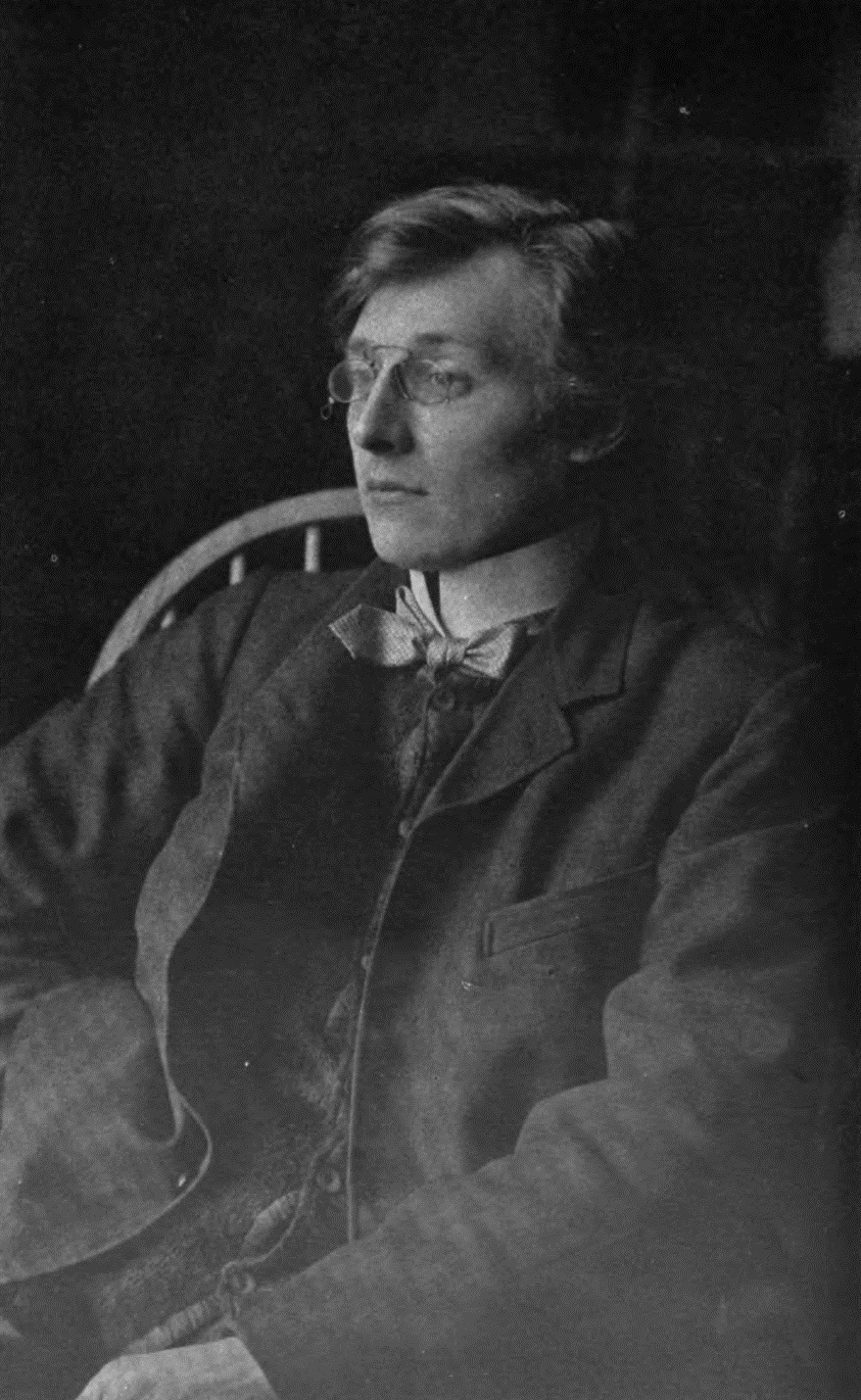
- Craig before 1903
- Born: Edward Godwin; 16 January 1872; Stevenage, England
- Died: 29 July 1966 (aged 94); Vence, France
- Occupations: Stage designer; theatre director; theatre theorist; actor
- Spouse: Helen Mary Gibson (m. 1893; div. 1932)
- Partner(s): Elena Meo; Isadora Duncan
- Children: 12
- Parent(s): Edward Godwin (father); Ellen Terry (mother)
- Relatives: Edith Craig (sister)
- Writing career
- Period: Modernism
- Movement: Symbolism

Edward Henry Gordon Craig (born Edward Godwin; 16 January 1872 – 29 July 1966) was an English modernist theatre practitioner. Part of the Terry family and son of the actress Ellen Terry, he worked as an actor in his youth before becoming a director and scenic designer, and he developed an influential body of theoretical writings.

The Gordon Craig Theatre, built in Stevenage, England (the town of his birth), was named in his honour in 1975.

== Early life and education ==
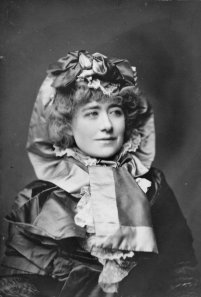
Craig's mother, Ellen Terry, ca. 1880

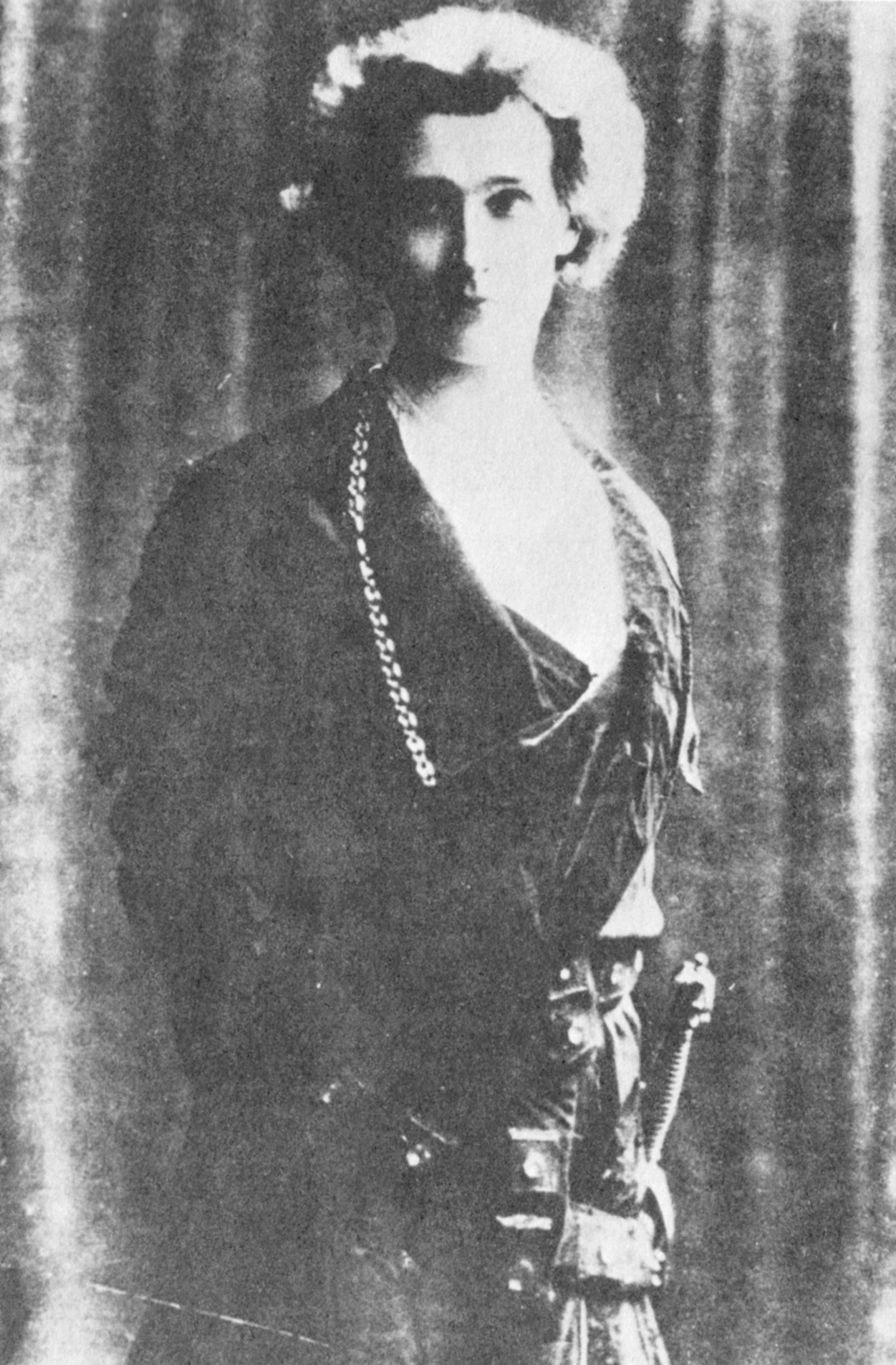
Craig as Hamlet, Olympic Theatre, 1897

The illegitimate son of the architect Edward Godwin and the actress Ellen Terry, Craig was born Edward, after his father, on 16 January 1872 in Railway Street, Stevenage, in Hertfordshire, England. Nicknamed Ted, he was not officially given a surname; he was baptised at age 16 as Edward Henry Gordon, after his godparents Sir Henry Irving and Lady Gordon. He and his sister Edith each chose the surname Craig by 1888 after admiring Ailsa Craig, an island off the coast of Scotland, while there on holiday; he finalised it officially by deed poll at age 21.

Unlike his sister, Craig was not fond of their stepfather, from 1877 to 1881, the actor Charles Clavering Wardell, although he was kind to them. The children used the surname Wardell during that time, however, to deflect the stigma of illegitimacy. From 1879, Craig spent much of his childhood backstage at the Lyceum Theatre, where his mother was the leading lady to Henry Irving from 1878. Irving was fond of Terry's children, and in 1930 Craig wrote a book-length tribute to Irving. He attended Bradfield College in Berkshire from May 1886 to July 1887. He later attended Heidelberg University but was also expelled from there.

== Career ==
Craig asserted that the director was "the true artist of the theatre" and, controversially, suggested viewing actors as no more important than marionettes. He designed and built elaborately symbolic sets; for instance, a set composed of his patented movable screens for the Moscow Art Theatre production of Hamlet. He was also the editor and chief writer for the first international theatre magazine, The Mask.

He worked as an actor in the company of Henry Irving from 1889, making his stage debut as Arthur de St. Valery in The Dead Heart at the Lyceum Theatre on 28 September 1889 (his real mother played his character's mother). He subsequently played Romeo, Macbeth and Hamlet with other companies, but comparing himself with Irving, he candidly admitted that he was not destined to be a great actor. He became more interested in art, learning to carve wood under the tutelage of James Pryde and William Nicholson. His acting career ended in 1897, when he went into theatrical design.

Craig's first productions as a scenic designer were Purcell's Dido and Aeneas, Handel's Acis and Galatea (both inspired and conducted by his lifelong friend Martin Shaw, who founded the Purcell Operatic Society with him to produce them), and Ibsen's The Vikings at Helgeland, were produced in London. The production of Dido and Aeneas was a considerable success and highly influential in reviving interest in the music of Purcell, then so little known that three copies of The Times review were delivered to the theatre: one addressed to Mr Shaw, one to Mr Craig, and one to Mr Purcell. Craig concentrated on keeping his designs simple, so as to set-off the movements of the actors and of light, and introduced the idea of a "unified stage picture" that covered all the elements of design.

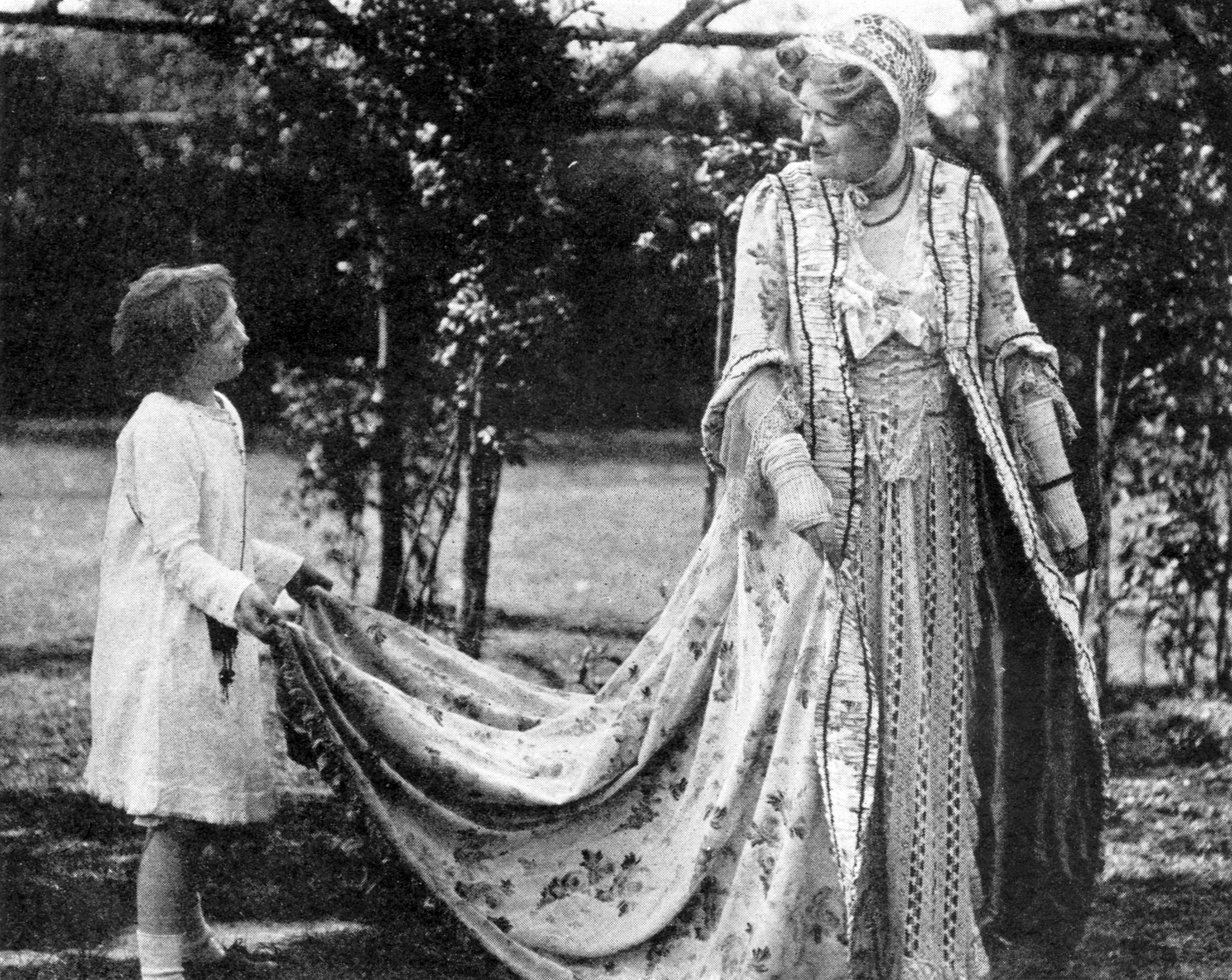
Craig's daughter, Nelly Gordon, with Ellen Terry in her garden, ca. 1918

After finding little financial success in Britain, Craig set out for Germany in 1904. While there, he wrote one of his most famous works, the essay The Art of the Theatre (later reprinted with the title On the Art of the Theatre). In 1908, the dancer Isadora Duncan introduced Craig to Konstantin Stanislavski, the founder of the Moscow Art Theatre, who invited him to direct their popular production of Hamlet with the company, which opened in December 1911. After settling in Italy, Craig created a school of theatrical design with support from Lord Howard de Walden, the Arena Goldoni in Florence. During World War I, he wrote a cycle of puppet plays, the Drama for Fools, and published a theatre magazine, The Marionnette (1918).

Craig was considered extremely difficult to work with and ultimately refused to direct or design any project over which he did not have complete artistic control. This led to his withdrawal from practical theatre production. His later career is remarkable for how little he achieved after the age of forty. In 1929, Craig produced a remarkable series of woodcuts as illustrations for a special edition of Hamlet published by Count Harry Kessler in a German translation by Gerhardt Hauptmann, an English edition of which appeared the following year.

He was appointed an Officer of the Order of the British Empire (OBE) and in 1958 was made a Member of the Order of the Companions of Honour (CH).

== Pseudonyms ==
While often working under his own name, Craig also signed work with a large number of other names, including John Balance, Oliver Bath, Julius Oliver, Giulio Pirro, Samuel Prim, and Stanislas Lodochowskowski.

== Ideas ==
Craig's idea of using neutral, mobile, non-representational screens as a staging device is probably his most famous scenographic concept. In 1910 Craig filed a patent which described in considerable technical detail a system of hinged and fixed flats that could be quickly arranged to cater for both internal and external scenes. He presented a set to William Butler Yeats for use at the Abbey Theatre in Ireland, who shared his symbolist aesthetic.

Craig's second innovation was in stage lighting. Doing away with traditional footlights, Craig lit the stage from above, placing lights in the ceiling of the theatre. Colour and light also became central to Craig's stage conceptualizations. Under the play of this light, the background becomes a deep shimmering blue, apparently almost translucent, upon which the green and purple make a harmony of great richness.

The third remarkable aspect of Craig's experiments in theatrical form were his attempts to integrate design elements with his work with actors. His mise en scène sought to articulate the relationships in space between movement, sound, line, and colour. Craig promoted a theatre focused on the craft of the director – a theatre where action, words, colour and rhythm combine in dynamic dramatic form. All of his life, Craig sought to capture "pure emotion" or "arrested development" in the plays on which he worked. Even during the years when he was not producing plays, Craig continued to make models, to conceive stage designs and to work on directorial plans that were never to reach performance. He believed that a director should approach a play with no preconceptions and he embraced this in his fading up from the minimum or blank canvas approach.

As an engraver and a classical artist, Craig found inspiration in puppets and masks. In his 1910 article "A Note on Masks", Craig expounds the virtue of using masks as a mechanism for capturing the audience's attention, imagination and soul. "There is only one actor – nay one man who has the soul of the dramatic poet, and who has ever served as the true and loyal interpreter of the poet," he proclaimed, and "this is the marionette."

On the Art of the Theatre (1911) is written as a dialogue between a Playgoer and a Stage Director, who examine the problems of the nature of stage directing. Craig argues that it was not dramatists, but rather performers who made the first works of drama, using action, words, line, colour and rhythm. Craig goes on to contend that only the director who seeks to interpret drama truly, and commits to training in all aspects of dramatic art, can restore the "Art of the Theatre". Maintaining that the director should seek a faithful interpretation of the text, Craig argues that audiences go to the theatre to see, rather than to hear, plays. The design elements may transcend reality and function as symbols, he thought, thereby communicating a deeper meaning, rather than simply reflecting the real world.

Caricature of Craig by Max Beerbohm from A Survey, published in 1921. In his private notebook, Beerbohm describes Craig in these terms: "Playing piano––leaping up––throwing back his hair––flowing cloak. German student––Heidelberg––one expected sabre-cuts––Unearthly––the Young Bacchus––His amours, almost mythological ... Pure type of artist––genius."

On 29 June 1908 the Polish theatre director, playwright, and theoretician of drama Leon Schiller initiated a correspondence with Craig. Together with his letter Schiller sent Craig, in Florence, his essay, "Dwa teatry" ("Two Theatres"), translated into English by Madeline Meager. Craig responded immediately, accepting the essay for his magazine, The Mask. This was the beginning of a productive collaboration between the two prominent theatre directors, who introduced each other's theoretical writings to foreign readers.

== Personal life and death ==
In 1893 Craig married Helen Mary (May) Gibson, with whom he had five children: Philip Carlisle (born 1894), Rosemary Nell (born 1894), Henry Edward Robin (born 1895), John (born 1896) and Peter (born 1897).

He met Elena Meo, a violinist, daughter of artist Gaetano Meo, in 1900, and they had three children together: Ellen (1903–1904), Nell (1904–1975), and Edward (1905–1998). Craig lived with Elena Meo and their two surviving children on and off, in England and Italy. May Craig would not consent to a divorce until 1932, after Craig and Meo had permanently separated. Craig fathered at least seven other illegitimate children: With the actress Jess Dorynne, a daughter, Kitty; with Isadora Duncan, a daughter, Deirdre Beatrice (1906–1913), who drowned at the age of seven with another of Duncan's children, Patrick Augustus, and their nanny; with the poet Dorothy Nevile Leesa a son, Davidino Lees (1916–2004); and with his secretary/translator Daphne Woodward, a daughter Daphne "Two Two" (1935–1995) .

Due to his difficult personality and consequent loss of engagements, Craig lived in straitened circumstances in France for much of his life, and he and his children were often supported by Ellen Terry. He was interned by German Occupation forces in 1942. He died at Vence, France, in 1966, aged 94.

== Archives and legacy ==
Craig's archive was purchased by Hans Posse on instructions from Adolf Hitler, for Hitler's planned Führermuseum in Linz, Austria. The purchase price was nearly 2.4 million French francs.

One of the largest collections of Edward Gordon Craig's papers is held at the Harry Ransom Center at the University of Texas at Austin. The 32-box collection includes Craig's diaries, essays, reviews, notes, manuscripts, financial records, and correspondence. Over 130 personal photographs are present in the archive. The Ransom Center's art holdings including some of Craig's woodblocks from the Cranach Press Hamlet as well as proof prints made during production of the book. The center's library holds over 300 books from Craig's personal collection. In addition to the archive of Edward Gordon Craig, the Ransom Center holds important holdings relating to Craig's mother Ellen Terry, as well as the archive of his son Edward Carrick.

David Hare's play Grace Pervades, explores the lives of Irving, Terry and her children. It premiered in 2025 at Theatre Royal, Bath, transferring in 2026 to the Theatre Royal, Haymarket.

== The Edward Gordon Craig Lecture ==
The Society of Theatre Research offers the annual Edward Gordon Craig lecture in conjunction with the Royal Central School of Speech and Drama.

== Bibliography ==
- Gordon Craig's Book of Penny Toys (1899)
- Henry Irving, Ellen Terry, etc.: A Book of Portraits (1899)
- The London School of Theatrical Art (1905)
- Motion (1907)
- On the Art of the Theatre (1911)
- Towards a New Theatre (1913)
- The Theatre Advancing (1919)
- Woodcuts and Some Words (1923)
- Henry Irving (1930)
- Ellen Terry and her Secret Self (1931)
- Index to the Stories of my Days (1957)

Source: Edward Gordon Craig: A Bibliography (Society for Theatre Research) 1967.

== Sources ==
- Bablet, Denis. 1981. The Theatre of Edward Gordon Craig. London: Methuen. ISBN 978-0-413-47880-1.
- Brockett, Oscar G. and Franklin J. Hildy. 2003. History of the Theatre. Ninth edition, International edition. Boston: Allyn and Bacon. ISBN 0-205-41050-2.
- Craig, Edward Gordon. 1906. Isadora Duncan, Six Movement Designs. Leipsig.
- ---. 1911. On the Art of the Theatre. Ed. Franc Chamberlain. London: Routledge, 2008. ISBN 978-0-415-45034-8.
- Craig, Edward Gordon. The Drama for Fools / Le Théâtre des fous. Edit. Didier Plassard, Marion Chénetier-ALev, Marc Duvillier. Montpellier: L'Entretemps, 2012. ISBN 978-2-355-39147-7.
- Innes, Christopher. 1983. Edward Gordon Craig. Directors in Perspective ser. Cambridge: Cambridge University Press. ISBN 0-521-27383-8.
- Holroyd, Michael. 2008. A Strange Eventful History. Farrar Straus Giroux. ISBN 0-7011-7987-2.
- Leiter, Samuel L. 1994. The Great Stage Directors: 100 Distinguished Careers of the Theatre. Illustrated ed. New York: Facts on File. ISBN 978-0-8160-2602-9.
- Ulla Poulsen Skou. 1973. Genier er som Tordenvejr – Gordon Craig på Det Kgl. Teater 1926. Selskabet for Dansk Teaterhistorie, 1973. In Danish, with 36 unpublished letters from Gordon Craig as an appendix in English.
- Shearer, Moira (1999). Ellen Terry. Phoenix Mill: Sutton Publishing. ISBN 0-7509-1526-9.
- Steegmuller, Francis. 1974. Your Isadora: The Love Story of Isadora Duncan & Gordon Craig. Pub Center Cultural Resources. ISBN 978-0-394-48698-7.
- Taxidou, Olga. 1998. The Mask: A Periodical Performance by Edward Gordon Craig. Contemporary Theatre Studies ser. volume 30. Amsterdam: Harwood Academic Publishers. ISBN 90-5755-046-6.
- Walton, J. Michael. 1983. Craig on Theatre. London: Methuen. ISBN 978-0-413-47220-5.
- Wills, J. Robert. 1976. The Director in a Changing Theatre. Palo Alto, CA: Mayfield. ISBN 978-0-87484-349-1.
- L. M. Newman, The White Fan: Gordon Craig's neglected masterpiece of symbolist staging (2009. Malkin Press)
- Leon Schiller, U progu nowego teatru, 1908–1924 (On the Threshold of the New Theater, 1908–1924), edited by Jerzy Timoszewicz, Warsaw, Państwowy Instytut Wydawniczy, 1978.
