= Dioclesian =

Semi-opera by Henry Purcell

- Semi-opera by Henry Purcell
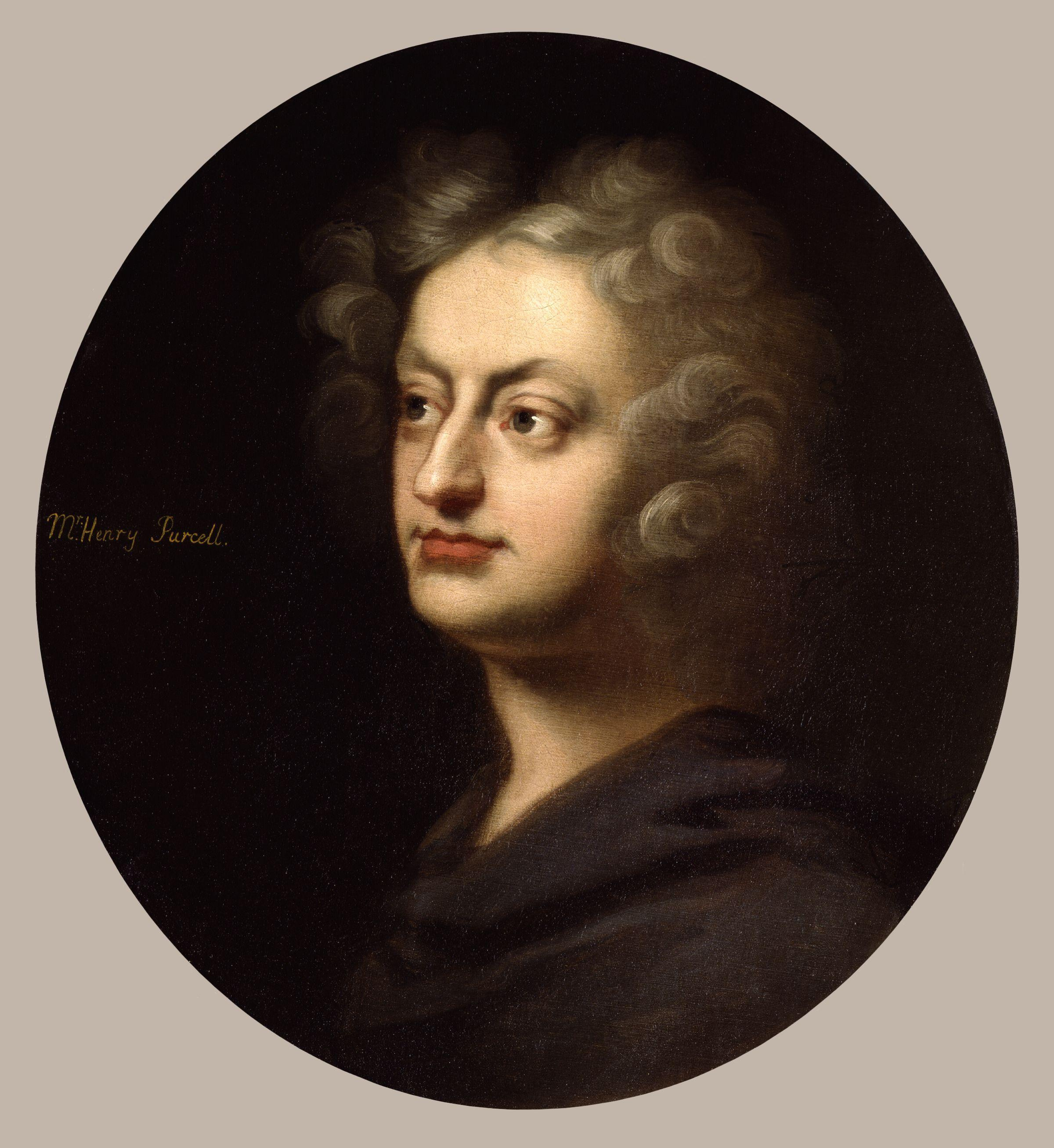
- The composer, portrait by John Closterman, c. 1695
- Librettist: Thomas Betterton
- Based on: life of the Emperor Diocletian
- Premiere: 1690; Queen's Theatre, Dorset Garden

Dioclesian (The Prophetess: or, The History of Dioclesian) is an English tragicomic semi-opera in five acts by Henry Purcell to a libretto by Thomas Betterton based on the play The Prophetess, by John Fletcher and Philip Massinger, which in turn was based very loosely on the life of the Emperor Diocletian. It was premiered in late May 1690 at the Queen's Theatre, Dorset Garden. The play was first produced in 1622. Choreography for the various dances was provided by Josias Priest, who worked with Purcell on several other semi-operas.

Betterton reworked the play extensively, making room for a great deal of Purcell's music, notably in the 'monster' scene at the end of Act II and the final Masque about the victory of Love, which remained popular until well into the eighteenth century.

The premier production had a Prologue written by John Dryden that was suppressed after only one performance; it was far too critical of King William's military campaign in Ireland.

== Synopsis ==
The story is ostensibly about the struggle for power in Ancient Rome, but actually about the universal struggle between love and duty. Delphia, a prophetess, foretells that Diocles, a footsoldier, will become emperor after he kills a "mighty boar" and marry Delphia's niece Drusilla, who is in love with him. Diocles takes the prophecy seriously, and starts slaughtering pigs. As it turns out, a soldier called Volutius Aper (Aper=boar) has murdered the old emperor, and Diocles kills Aper in revenge. As a reward for this action he is made co-emperor and renames himself Dioclesian. He ignores his promise to marry Drusilla, and courts his co-emperor's sister the princess Aurelia instead. This angers Delphia, who brings the wedding ceremony to a stop by conjuring a storm and a monster. She then causes the princess to fall in love with Diocles' rival Maximinian, and the Persians to defeat the Roman army. Diocles realises the error of his ways, routs the invaders, cedes his half of the throne to Maximinian, and moves to Lombardy with Drusilla.

== Instrumentation ==
The instruments used in this piece are two trumpets in C and D, two oboes (called 'hautboy'), tenor oboe (called 'tenor hautboy', equivalent to the modern English Horn), two flutes, bassoon, strings, and continuo.

== Recordings ==
- The Masque in Dioclesian Honor Sheppard, Sally LeSarge, Alfred Deller, Phillip Todd, Maurice Bevan, Choir and Orchestra of the Concentus Musicus Wien. Conducted by Alfred Deller (Vanguard, 1972)
- Timon Of Athens/Dioclesian, Lynne Dawson, English Baroque Soloists and the Monteverdi Choir conducted by John Eliot Gardiner (Erato, 1988)
- Timon Of Athens/Dioclesian Collegium Musicum 90, conducted by Richard Hickox (Chandos, 1995)
- Timon Of Athens/Dioclesian The English Concert, conducted by Trevor Pinnock (Archiv, 1995)
