= The Vikings at Helgeland =

1858 play written by Henrik Ibsen

The Vikings at Helgeland (Norwegian: Hærmændene paa Helgeland) is Henrik Ibsen's seventh play. It was written during 1857 and first performed at Christiania Norske Theater in Oslo on 24 November 1858. The story takes place during the time of Erik Blood-axe (c. 930 – c. 934) in the north of Norway in historic Helgeland, a time in which Norwegian society was adjusting from the tradition of Old Norse Sagas to the new era of Christianity. It concerns the arrival of Ørnulf, who with his seven sons is seeking his daughter, Dagny, and foster-daughter, Hjørdis, who were abducted and married by Sigurd and Gunnar, respectively. Tragedy compounded by conceptions of honour and duty lead to the deaths of all of Ørnulf's sons, Sigurd (who is killed by Hjørdis), and Hjørdis (by suicide). The plot is reminiscent of the Germanic myth of Sigmund and Brynhilde.

== Characters ==
- Sigurd the Strong, Sea-King
- Gunnar, rich Helgeland farmer
- Ørnulf, Icelandic Chieftain
- Hjørdis, Ørnulf's foster daughter
- Dagny Ørnulf's daughter
- Egil, Gunnar's and Hjørdis' four-year-old son
- Kåre, Helgeland peasant

== Translations ==
This play was translated into English by Scottish writer and critic William Archer as a part of his publication Henrik Ibsen's Prose Dramas Vol. III. This volume consisted of Lady Inger of Östrat (Fru Inger til Østeraad); The Vikings at Helgeland (Hærmændene paa Helgeland); and The Pretenders (Kongs-Emnerne). It was published by The Walter Scott Company, London in 1890.

== Legacy ==
The appearance of the character Dagny in this play is considered to have contributed to the revival of the popularity of this name in Norway and in Scandinavia in general, in the second half of the 19th century.

== Other sources ==
- James McFarlane, editor (1962). The Oxford Ibsen, Volume II. Oxford University Press. ISBN 978-0-19-211334-4.
- James McFarlane, editor (1994). The Cambridge Companion to Ibsen. Cambridge University Press. ISBN 978-0-521-42321-2.
