= Listed buildings in Tenterden =

Civil Parish in Kent, England

Tenterden is a town and civil parish in the Borough of Ashford of Kent, England. It contains one grade I, 18 grade II* and 197 grade II listed buildings that are recorded in the National Heritage List for England.

This list is based on the information retrieved online from Historic England.

== Key ==
Grade	Criteria
I	Buildings that are of exceptional interest
II*	Particularly important buildings of more than special interest
II	Buildings that are of special interest

== Listing ==
Name	Grade	Location	Type	Completed (Note: The date given is the date used by Historic England as significant for the initial building or that of an important part in the structure's description.)	Date designated	Grid ref. (Note: The grid reference is based on the British national grid reference system, sometimes known as OSGB36, used by the Ordnance Survey.) Geo-coordinates	Notes	Entry number (Note: The "List Entry Number" is a unique number assigned to each listed building and scheduled monument by Historic England.)	Image	Wikidata
Barn Adjoining Belgar Farmhouse To South East	II	Appledore Road			8 June 1972	TQ8946033037; 51°03′55″N 0°42′09″E		1070385	Upload Photo	Q26324217
Belgar Farmhouse	II	Appledore Road			8 June 1972	TQ8943333060; 51°03′56″N 0°42′08″E		1363182	Upload Photo	Q26645020
Brunger Farmhouse	II	Appledore Road			8 May 1950	TQ8993233166; 51°03′59″N 0°42′34″E		1070382	Upload Photo	Q26324212
Finchden Manor	II*	Appledore Road			8 May 1950	TQ9007933127; 51°03′58″N 0°42′41″E		1363181	Upload Photo	Q17556964
Forstal Farmhouse	II	Appledore Road			8 May 1950	TQ8997232411; 51°03′35″N 0°42′34″E		1070386	Upload Photo	Q26324220
Gatepiers And Garden Wall In Grounds Of Finchden Manor To The South West Of The House	II	Appledore Road			8 June 1972	TQ9005033116; 51°03′57″N 0°42′40″E		1232761	Upload Photo	Q26526272
Gatepiers To Finchden Manor To The South East Of The House	II	Appledore Road			8 June 1972	TQ9012433084; 51°03′56″N 0°42′43″E		1232762	Upload Photo	Q26526273
Gibbet Oak Farmhouse	II	Appledore Road			8 June 1972	TQ9093432560; 51°03′38″N 0°43′24″E		1070384	Upload Photo	Q26324215
Kench Hill	II	Appledore Road			8 May 1950	TQ9060232231; 51°03′28″N 0°43′06″E		1070387	Upload Photo	Q26324222
Leigh Green Farmhouse	II	Appledore Road			3 April 1985	TQ8981033295; 51°04′03″N 0°42′28″E		1071131	Upload Photo	Q26326056
Maynard's Farmhouse	II*	Appledore Road			8 June 1972	TQ9015833068; 51°03′56″N 0°42′45″E		1070383	Upload Photo	Q17556017
Priory Farmhouse	II	Appledore Road			8 May 1950	TQ9003833032; 51°03′55″N 0°42′39″E		1363183	Upload Photo	Q26645021
Stables To Finchden Manor	II	Appledore Road			8 May 1950	TQ9012533105; 51°03′57″N 0°42′44″E		1276915	Upload Photo	Q26566388
The Old Farm House	II	Appledore Road			8 June 1972	TQ9004332410; 51°03′34″N 0°42′38″E		1363184	Upload Photo	Q26645022
1, Ashford Road	II	1, Ashford Road			8 May 1950	TQ8856833564; 51°04′14″N 0°41′25″E		1070388	Upload Photo	Q26324224
3, Ashford Road	II	3, Ashford Road			8 May 1950	TQ8856933575; 51°04′14″N 0°41′25″E		1070389	Upload Photo	Q26324226
5, Ashford Road	II	5, Ashford Road			8 May 1950	TQ8857133583; 51°04′14″N 0°41′25″E		1070390	Upload Photo	Q26324228
7, Ashford Road	II	7, Ashford Road			8 April 1970	TQ8857133587; 51°04′14″N 0°41′25″E		1057707	Upload Photo	Q26309873
9, Ashford Road	II	9, Ashford Road			8 June 1972	TQ8857333593; 51°04′14″N 0°41′25″E		1070391	Upload Photo	Q26324230
11, 13 And 15, Ashford Road	II	11, 13 And 15, Ashford Road			8 June 1972	TQ8857533603; 51°04′15″N 0°41′25″E		1057668	Upload Photo	Q26309836
25, Ashford Road	II	25, Ashford Road			8 April 1970	TQ8858133642; 51°04′16″N 0°41′25″E		1070393	Upload Photo	Q26324235
27, Ashford Road	II	27, Ashford Road			8 May 1950	TQ8858533658; 51°04′17″N 0°41′26″E		1345564	Upload Photo	Q26629176
The White House	II*	31, Ashford Road			8 May 1950	TQ8859433695; 51°04′18″N 0°41′26″E		1070394	Upload Photo	Q17556024
The Old Meeting House (Unitarian Chapel)	II	33, Ashford Road			8 May 1950	TQ8860033717; 51°04′18″N 0°41′26″E		1038326	Upload Photo	Q26290041
Parsonage House	II	35, Ashford Road			8 May 1950	TQ8861733737; 51°04′19″N 0°41′27″E		1070395	Upload Photo	Q26324237
21 And 23, Ashford Road	II	21 And 23, Ashford Road			8 June 1972	TQ8857833628; 51°04′16″N 0°41′25″E		1070392	Upload Photo	Q26324233
2-22, Ashford Road	II	2-22, Ashford Road			8 May 1950	TQ8859433574; 51°04′14″N 0°41′26″E		1374500	Upload Photo	Q26655367
Church Of St Michael	II	Ashford Road			8 June 1972	TQ8845135381; 51°05′12″N 0°41′22″E		1363206	Upload Photo	Q26645043
Homewood Cottage	II	Ashford Road			8 June 1972	TQ8886334291; 51°04′37″N 0°41′41″E		1070356	Upload Photo	Q26324162
Homewood	II	Ashford Road			8 May 1950	TQ8880534276; 51°04′36″N 0°41′38″E	Three-story, five-bay house of red brick, 1766	1363185	Upload Photo	Q26645023
Isleden	II	Ashford Road			8 June 1972	TQ8863035086; 51°05′03″N 0°41′31″E		1363205	Upload Photo	Q26645042
Pair Of K6 Telephone Kiosks Outside Tenterden Post Office	II	Ashford Road			17 February 1989	TQ8858433608; 51°04′15″N 0°41′25″E		1071132	Upload Photo	Q26326058
1 And 3, Bell's Lane	II	1 And 3, Bell's Lane			8 June 1972	TQ8841733283; 51°04′05″N 0°41′16″E		1070358	Upload Photo	Q26324166
14 And 16, Bell's Lane	II	14 And 16, Bell's Lane			8 June 1972	TQ8841733239; 51°04′03″N 0°41′16″E		1363208	Upload Photo	Q26645045
2-8, Bell's Lane	II	2-8, Bell's Lane			8 June 1972	TQ8840133274; 51°04′04″N 0°41′15″E		1070359	Upload Photo	Q26324168
5-9, Bell's Lane	II	5-9, Bell's Lane			8 June 1972	TQ8842033272; 51°04′04″N 0°41′16″E		1363207	Upload Photo	Q26645044
93-103, Borough Place	II	93-103, Borough Place			8 April 1970	TQ8820933168; 51°04′01″N 0°41′05″E		1363195	Upload Photo	Q26645032
Bugglesden	II	Bugglesden Road			8 May 1950	TQ8695236522; 51°05′51″N 0°40′07″E		1070360	Upload Photo	Q26324170
Haffenden Farmhouse	II	Bugglesden Road			8 June 1972	TQ8702536349; 51°05′45″N 0°40′11″E		1070361	Upload Photo	Q26324172
1 And 2, Burgess Row	II	1 And 2, Burgess Row			8 June 1972	TQ8815433128; 51°04′00″N 0°41′02″E		1363209	Upload Photo	Q26645046
2, East Cross	II	2, East Cross			8 June 1972	TQ8851833443; 51°04′10″N 0°41′22″E		1070362	Upload Photo	Q26324174
3, East Cross	II	3, East Cross			8 June 1972	TQ8852433450; 51°04′10″N 0°41′22″E		1363210	Upload Photo	Q26645047
Chain House	II	6, East Cross			8 May 1950	TQ8853233469; 51°04′10″N 0°41′22″E		1031921	Upload Photo	Q26283316
7, East Cross	II	7, East Cross			8 May 1950	TQ8853633478; 51°04′11″N 0°41′23″E		1070363	Upload Photo	Q26324176
The Armoury	II	12, 13 And 14, East Cross			8 May 1950	TQ8854833522; 51°04′12″N 0°41′23″E		1363171	Upload Photo	Q26645010
10 And 11, East Cross	II	10 And 11, East Cross			8 May 1950	TQ8854133496; 51°04′11″N 0°41′23″E		1031842	Upload Photo	Q26283231
15 And 17, East Cross	II*	15 And 17, East Cross			8 May 1950	TQ8855433542; 51°04′13″N 0°41′24″E		1070364	Upload Photo	Q17556011
Drinking Fountain Situated On Edge Of Green	II	East Cross			8 June 1972	TQ8856833489; 51°04′11″N 0°41′24″E		1031817	Upload Photo	Q26283208
1, East Hill	II	1, East Hill			8 June 1972	TQ8882233669; 51°04′17″N 0°41′38″E		1070365	Upload Photo	Q26324178
East Hill House	II*	3, East Hill			8 May 1950	TQ8884433657; 51°04′16″N 0°41′39″E		1031824	Upload Photo	Q17556005
1 And 3, Golden Square	II	1 And 3, Golden Square			8 May 1950	TQ8877233673; 51°04′17″N 0°41′35″E		1363172	Upload Photo	Q26645011
2 And 4, Golden Square	II	2 And 4, Golden Square			8 May 1950	TQ8882133678; 51°04′17″N 0°41′38″E		1070366	Upload Photo	Q26324180
6 And 8, Golden Square	II	6 And 8, Golden Square			8 June 1972	TQ8882733686; 51°04′17″N 0°41′38″E		1031804	Upload Photo	Q26283194
1-17, St Michaels Terrace, Grange Road	II	1-17, St Michaels Terrace, Grange Road			8 June 1972	TQ8836035201; 51°05′07″N 0°41′17″E		1031371	Upload Photo	Q26282731
Briton House	II	Grange Road			14 September 1955	TQ8818235193; 51°05′07″N 0°41′08″E		1070367	Upload Photo	Q26324182
Church View	II	Grange Road			8 June 1972	TQ8843435159; 51°05′05″N 0°41′21″E		1363173	Upload Photo	Q26645012
Watersland	II	Grange Road			27 October 1993	TQ8754435096; 51°05′04″N 0°40′35″E		1277051	Upload Photo	Q26566514
Tenderden War Memorial	II	High Street			16 September 2019	TQ8817933193; 51°04′02″N 0°41′04″E		1466045	Upload Photo	Q97362069
6, High Street	II	6, High Street			8 May 1950	TQ8848133409; 51°04′09″N 0°41′20″E		1070341	Upload Photo	Q26324132
7, High Street	II	7, High Street			8 May 1950	TQ8848733373; 51°04′07″N 0°41′20″E		1070368	Upload Photo	Q26324184
Elmstone House	II	16, High Street			8 April 1970	TQ8844933388; 51°04′08″N 0°41′18″E		1363199	Upload Photo	Q26645036
17, High Street	II	17, High Street			8 May 1950	TQ8846333355; 51°04′07″N 0°41′19″E		1070369	Upload Photo	Q26324186
19, 21 And 21A, High Street	II	19, 21 And 21A, High Street			8 May 1950	TQ8845733349; 51°04′07″N 0°41′18″E		1025867	Upload Photo	Q26276797
22, High Street	II	22, High Street			8 April 1970	TQ8843133377; 51°04′08″N 0°41′17″E		1355061	Upload Photo	Q26637952
23, 25 And 27, High Street	II	23, 25 And 27, High Street			8 May 1950	TQ8844233338; 51°04′06″N 0°41′18″E		1070370	Upload Photo	Q26324189
The Town Hall	II	24, High Street			8 April 1970	TQ8842233372; 51°04′07″N 0°41′17″E		1070343	Upload Photo	Q26324136
The Woolpack Hotel	II	26, High Street			8 April 1970	TQ8840833365; 51°04′07″N 0°41′16″E		1363200	Upload Photo	Q26645037
28, High Street	II	28, High Street			8 April 1970	TQ8840433350; 51°04′07″N 0°41′16″E		1070344	Upload Photo	Q26324138
30, High Street	II	30, High Street			8 June 1972	TQ8840033346; 51°04′07″N 0°41′15″E		1025298	Upload Photo	Q26276162
32, High Street	II	32, High Street			8 May 1950	TQ8839233343; 51°04′07″N 0°41′15″E		1363201	Upload Photo	Q26645038
40, High Street	II	40, High Street			8 June 1972	TQ8837633331; 51°04′06″N 0°41′14″E		1203228	Upload Photo	Q26498780
42, High Street	II	42, High Street			8 June 1972	TQ8836633325; 51°04′06″N 0°41′14″E		1070346	Upload Photo	Q26324142
44, High Street	II	44, High Street			8 June 1972	TQ8835833320; 51°04′06″N 0°41′13″E		1203243	Upload Photo	Q26498795
45, High Street	II	45, High Street			8 April 1970	TQ8837733302; 51°04′05″N 0°41′14″E		1025846	Upload Photo	Q26276778
47, High Street	II	47, High Street			8 April 1970	TQ8837033297; 51°04′05″N 0°41′14″E		1070373	Upload Photo	Q26324195
49, High Street	II	49, High Street			8 April 1970	TQ8836433292; 51°04′05″N 0°41′14″E		1025851	Upload Photo	Q26276783
51, High Street	II	51, High Street			8 June 1972	TQ8835833285; 51°04′05″N 0°41′13″E		1070375	Upload Photo	Q26324198
The White Lion Hotel	II	57, High Street			8 May 1950	TQ8833833264; 51°04′04″N 0°41′12″E		1070376	Upload Photo	Q26324200
58, High Street	II	58, High Street			10 February 2025	TQ8831733303; 51°04′05″N 0°41′11″E		1491959	Upload Photo	Q136386098
60, High Street	II	60, High Street			8 June 1972	TQ8830833300; 51°04′05″N 0°41′11″E		1070347	Upload Photo	Q26324144
62, High Street	II	62, High Street			8 April 1970	TQ8830133297; 51°04′05″N 0°41′10″E		1203254	Upload Photo	Q26498806
Beach House	II	67, High Street			8 May 1950	TQ8830333238; 51°04′03″N 0°41′10″E		1363176	Upload Photo	Q26645015
72, High Street	II	72, High Street			8 June 1972	TQ8827133283; 51°04′05″N 0°41′09″E		1203260	Upload Photo	Q26498811
74, High Street	II	74, High Street			8 June 1972	TQ8826633281; 51°04′05″N 0°41′08″E		1070349	Upload Photo	Q26324148
Pittlesden Gatehouse	II	91, High Street			8 April 1970	TQ8823433170; 51°04′01″N 0°41′07″E		1070336	Upload Photo	Q26324121
106, High Street	II	106, High Street			8 June 1972	TQ8813533211; 51°04′03″N 0°41′02″E		1070352	Upload Photo	Q26324154
109, High Street	II	109, High Street			8 June 1972	TQ8818133150; 51°04′01″N 0°41′04″E		1363196	Upload Photo	Q26645033
116, High Street	II	116, High Street			8 April 1970	TQ8810733196; 51°04′02″N 0°41′00″E		1070353	Upload Photo	Q26324156
118, High Street	II	118, High Street			8 April 1970	TQ8810333194; 51°04′02″N 0°41′00″E		1363203	Upload Photo	Q26645040
142, High Street	II	142, High Street			8 May 1950	TQ8801833148; 51°04′01″N 0°40′56″E		1203312	Upload Photo	Q26498859
1 And 1A, High Street	II	1 And 1A, High Street			8 June 1972	TQ8853333400; 51°04′08″N 0°41′22″E		1363174	Upload Photo	Q26645013
10-14, High Street	II	10-14, High Street			8 June 1972	TQ8846233397; 51°04′08″N 0°41′19″E		1025318	Upload Photo	Q26276180
102 And 104, High Street	II	102 And 104, High Street			8 April 1970	TQ8814633218; 51°04′03″N 0°41′02″E		1203267	Upload Photo	Q26498818
105 And 107, High Street	II	105 And 107, High Street			8 May 1950	TQ8818833161; 51°04′01″N 0°41′04″E		1070337	Upload Photo	Q26324123
111-117, High Street	II	111-117, High Street			8 April 1970	TQ8816133146; 51°04′00″N 0°41′03″E		1070338	Upload Photo	Q26324126
112 And 114, High Street	II	112 And 114, High Street			8 May 1950	TQ8811433200; 51°04′02″N 0°41′01″E		1281757	Upload Photo	Q26570772
120-124, High Street	II	120-124, High Street			8 April 1970	TQ8809333187; 51°04′02″N 0°40′59″E		1203291	Upload Photo	Q26498840
126 And 126A, High Street	II	126 And 126A, High Street			8 April 1970	TQ8807833181; 51°04′02″N 0°40′59″E		1070354	Upload Photo	Q26324158
128 And 130, High Street	II	128 And 130, High Street			8 April 1970	TQ8807433177; 51°04′02″N 0°40′58″E		1070355	Upload Photo	Q26324160
129 And 131, High Street	II	129 And 131, High Street			8 April 1970	TQ8811133133; 51°04′00″N 0°41′00″E		1363197	Upload Photo	Q26645034
132 And 134, High Street	II	132 And 134, High Street			8 April 1970	TQ8806433171; 51°04′01″N 0°40′58″E		1203306	Upload Photo	Q26498854
133-137, High Street	II	133-137, High Street			8 April 1970	TQ8809933129; 51°04′00″N 0°41′00″E		1070339	Upload Photo	Q26324128
138 And 140, High Street	II	138 And 140, High Street			8 June 1972	TQ8803633157; 51°04′01″N 0°40′56″E		1363204	Upload Photo	Q26645041
139-143, High Street	II	139-143, High Street			8 June 1972	TQ8809033126; 51°04′00″N 0°40′59″E		1070340	Upload Photo	Q26324130
145 And 147, High Street	II	145 And 147, High Street			8 April 1970	TQ8807533119; 51°04′00″N 0°40′58″E		1363198	Upload Photo	Q26645035
18 And 20, High Street	II	18 And 20, High Street			8 May 1950	TQ8843933383; 51°04′08″N 0°41′18″E		1070342	Upload Photo	Q26324134
The Lemon Tree	II*	29-33, High Street			8 May 1950	TQ8842333329; 51°04′06″N 0°41′17″E		1025841	Upload Photo	Q17556000
Ye Olde Cellars Inn	II	3 And 5, High Street			8 May 1950	TQ8850733380; 51°04′08″N 0°41′21″E		1031378	Upload Photo	Q26282738
34 And 36, High Street	II	34 And 36, High Street			8 June 1972	TQ8838633339; 51°04′06″N 0°41′15″E		1070345	Upload Photo	Q26324140
35-41, High Street	II	35-41, High Street			8 June 1972	TQ8840433318; 51°04′06″N 0°41′16″E		1070371	Upload Photo	Q26324190
Hoof & Hook	II	43, High Street			8 May 1950	TQ8838533308; 51°04′05″N 0°41′15″E		1070372	Upload Photo	Q26324193
47A, High Street	II	47A, High Street			8 June 1972	TQ8837433290; 51°04′05″N 0°41′14″E		1070374	Upload Photo	Q26324196
52-56, High Street	II	52-56, High Street			8 June 1972	TQ8832933309; 51°04′06″N 0°41′12″E		1363202	Upload Photo	Q26645039
53 And 55, High Street	II	53 And 55, High Street			8 May 1950	TQ8835233281; 51°04′05″N 0°41′13″E		1025305	Upload Photo	Q26276168
63 And 65, High Street	II	63 And 65, High Street			8 May 1950	TQ8831033244; 51°04′03″N 0°41′11″E		1355026	Upload Photo	Q26637830
64 And 66, High Street	II	64 And 66, High Street			8 April 1970	TQ8829333293; 51°04′05″N 0°41′10″E		1070348	Upload Photo	Q26324146
79-85, High Street	II	79-85, High Street			8 April 1970	TQ8825633194; 51°04′02″N 0°41′08″E		1363194	Upload Photo	Q26645031
87 And 89, High Street	II	87 And 89, High Street			8 April 1970	TQ8824233179; 51°04′01″N 0°41′07″E		1070335	Upload Photo	Q26324118
90 And 92, High Street	II	90 And 92, High Street			8 June 1972	TQ8821233251; 51°04′04″N 0°41′06″E		1070350	Upload Photo	Q26324150
94-98, High Street	II	94-98, High Street			8 June 1972	TQ8819333243; 51°04′04″N 0°41′05″E		1070351	Upload Photo	Q26324152
K6 Telephone Kiosk	II	High Street			17 February 1989	TQ8824333258; 51°04′04″N 0°41′07″E		1071133	Upload Photo	Q26326061
Milestone Opposite No 53	II	High Street			8 June 1972	TQ8834733292; 51°04′05″N 0°41′13″E		1363175	Upload Photo	Q26645014
Parish Church Of St Mildred	I	High Street			8 May 1950	TQ8836833372; 51°04′08″N 0°41′14″E	W tower built of grey Bethersden marble, chancel basically 13C, aisled nave C14, perpendicular hexagonal font, alabaster monument to Herbert Whitfield #1622	1355024	Parish Church Of St Mildred More images	Q17529438
Pittlesden Barn	II	High Street			8 June 1972	TQ8814833280; 51°04′05″N 0°41′02″E		1281783	Upload Photo	Q26570798
1-10, Mayor's Place	II	1-10, Mayor's Place			8 April 1970	TQ8813133121; 51°04′00″N 0°41′01″E		1362820	Upload Photo	Q26644686
Aisled Timber Barn In Grounds Of Hales Place	II	Oaks Road			8 June 1972	TQ8892833361; 51°04′07″N 0°41′43″E		1071146	Upload Photo	Q26326091
Arch At South West Corner Of Hales Place	II	Oaks Road			8 May 1950	TQ8883833393; 51°04′08″N 0°41′38″E		1071144	Upload Photo	Q26326087
Garden Turrets In Grounds Of Hales Place	II*	Oaks Road			8 May 1950	TQ8886133489; 51°04′11″N 0°41′39″E		1362822	Upload Photo	Q17556923
Hales Place	II*	Oaks Road			8 May 1950	TQ8884733400; 51°04′08″N 0°41′39″E		1071143	Upload Photo	Q17556143
Oasthouse At Hales Place Adjoining Arch To Right	II	Oaks Road			8 June 1972	TQ8884133382; 51°04′07″N 0°41′38″E		1362821	Upload Photo	Q26644687
Well House In Grounds Of Hales Place	II	Oaks Road			8 May 1950	TQ8883833450; 51°04′10″N 0°41′38″E		1071145	Upload Photo	Q26326089
Purfields	II	Ox Lane			8 June 1972	TQ8890434599; 51°04′47″N 0°41′44″E		1070357	Upload Photo	Q26324164
Four Dwellings	II	1 And 2, Parkgate Road			8 May 1950	TQ8663634024; 51°04′31″N 0°39′46″E		1071148	Upload Photo	Q26326096
Brattle House	II	Parkgate Road			8 May 1950	TQ8699733689; 51°04′19″N 0°40′04″E		1071147	Upload Photo	Q26326094
Goods Hill House	II	Parkgate Road			8 May 1950	TQ8656634197; 51°04′36″N 0°39′43″E		1362824	Upload Photo	Q26644689
Parkgate Farm House	II	Parkgate Road			8 June 1972	TQ8580634702; 51°04′54″N 0°39′05″E		1071149	Upload Photo	Q26326098
Watermill House	II	Parkgate Road			8 June 1972	TQ8702233756; 51°04′22″N 0°40′06″E		1362823	Upload Photo	Q26644688
Coldharbour Farmhouse	II	Plummers Lane			8 June 1972	TQ8701732670; 51°03′46″N 0°40′03″E		1203374	Upload Photo	Q26498915
Pigeon Hoo	II*	Preston Lane			8 May 1950	TQ9084933576; 51°04′11″N 0°43′22″E		1071151	Upload Photo	Q17556147
The Dandy	II	Preston Lane			8 May 1950	TQ9108533817; 51°04′19″N 0°43′34″E		1071150	Upload Photo	Q26326100
Church Of St Mary	II	Reading Street			8 May 1950	TQ9217830661; 51°02′35″N 0°44′24″E		1071155	Upload Photo	Q26326111
Ebony Cottage	II	Reading Street			8 May 1950	TQ9225230520; 51°02′31″N 0°44′28″E		1071153	Upload Photo	Q26326106
Frenchay Farmhouse	II	Reading Street			8 June 1972	TQ9134532092; 51°03′23″N 0°43′44″E		1203400	Upload Photo	Q26498937
Old Barrack Farm	II	Reading Street			8 June 1972	TQ9225130415; 51°02′27″N 0°44′28″E		1203412	Upload Photo	Q26498949
Ramsden Farmhouse	II	Reading Street			8 May 1950	TQ9203730796; 51°02′40″N 0°44′17″E		1071152	Upload Photo	Q26326104
Skeers House	II	Reading Street			8 June 1972	TQ9225830457; 51°02′29″N 0°44′28″E		1071154	Upload Photo	Q26326109
Wellbro Cottage	II	Reading Street			8 June 1972	TQ9226030475; 51°02′29″N 0°44′28″E		1203408	Upload Photo	Q26498945
Ashbourne Mill And House Adjoining	II	Rolvenden Road			8 June 1972	TQ8649032898; 51°03′54″N 0°39′37″E		1071158	Upload Photo	Q26326116
Isemonger	II	Rolvenden Road			8 June 1972	TQ8704233063; 51°03′59″N 0°40′05″E		1281698	Upload Photo	Q26570718
Little Westwell	II	Rolvenden Road			8 June 1972	TQ8755433015; 51°03′57″N 0°40′31″E		1203427	Upload Photo	Q26498963
Oasthouse Adjoining Isemonger To Left	II	Rolvenden Road			8 June 1972	TQ8701233087; 51°04′00″N 0°40′04″E		1071157	Upload Photo	Q26326113
Westwell	II*	Rolvenden Road			8 May 1950	TQ8771033064; 51°03′58″N 0°40′40″E		1071156	Upload Photo	Q17556150
Huson	II	Sandy Lane			8 June 1972	TQ8886633136; 51°03′59″N 0°41′39″E		1362826	Upload Photo	Q26644691
Cherry Tree House	II	1, Smallhythe Road			8 April 1970	TQ8795833075; 51°03′58″N 0°40′52″E		1203439	Upload Photo	Q26498974
Honglands Cottages	II	1 And 2, Smallhythe Road			8 June 1972	TQ8873931177; 51°02′56″N 0°41′29″E		1281653	Upload Photo	Q26570678
3 And 3A, Smallhythe Road	II	3 And 3A, Smallhythe Road			8 June 1972	TQ8796233061; 51°03′58″N 0°40′52″E		1071159	Upload Photo	Q26326117
7-13, Smallhythe Road	II	7-13, Smallhythe Road			8 April 1970	TQ8797533026; 51°03′57″N 0°40′53″E		1362788	Upload Photo	Q26644657
Ashenden	II*	Smallhythe Road			8 May 1950	TQ8945331428; 51°03′03″N 0°42′06″E		1362789	Upload Photo	Q17556914
Banks House	II	Smallhythe Road			8 June 1972	TQ8931030136; 51°02′22″N 0°41′56″E		1362810	Banks House More images	Q26644676
Barn In Grounds Of Smallhythe Place	II	Smallhythe Road			8 June 1972	TQ8937230005; 51°02′17″N 0°41′59″E		1362791	Barn In Grounds Of Smallhythe Place More images	Q26644658
Bulleign Farmhouse	II	Smallhythe Road			8 June 1972	TQ8860430171; 51°02′24″N 0°41′20″E		1362811	Upload Photo	Q26644677
Chestnut House	II*	Smallhythe Road			8 May 1950	TQ8797832965; 51°03′55″N 0°40′53″E		1203483	Upload Photo	Q17556413
Church Of St John The Baptist	II*	Smallhythe Road			8 May 1950	TQ8935530162; 51°02′23″N 0°41′59″E	Early C16 brickwork	1362790	Church Of St John The Baptist More images	Q17556918
Dumbourne Farmhouse	II	Smallhythe Road			8 June 1972	TQ9000830952; 51°02′47″N 0°42′33″E		1071162	Upload Photo	Q26326124
Dutch Cottage (In Grounds Of Morghew)	II	Smallhythe Road			8 June 1972	TQ8809432042; 51°03′25″N 0°40′57″E		1071122	Upload Photo	Q26326039
Heronden Hall	II	Smallhythe Road			8 June 1972	TQ8779232777; 51°03′49″N 0°40′43″E		1281686	Upload Photo	Q26570706
Heronden	II	Smallhythe Road			8 June 1972	TQ8821932646; 51°03′44″N 0°41′05″E		1362809	Upload Photo	Q26644675
Little Paddock	II	Smallhythe Road			8 May 1950	TQ8882632060; 51°03′25″N 0°41′35″E		1071160	Upload Photo	Q26326120
Martin's Cottage	II	Smallhythe Road			8 June 1972	TQ8931430078; 51°02′20″N 0°41′56″E		1203579	Upload Photo	Q26499100
Morghew	II	Smallhythe Road			8 May 1950	TQ8834332232; 51°03′31″N 0°41′10″E		1281651	Upload Photo	Q26570676
Oasthouses And Granary At Pickhill Farm	II	Smallhythe Road			8 June 1972	TQ8884731621; 51°03′10″N 0°41′35″E		1281675	Upload Photo	Q26570698
Pickhill Farmhouse	II	Smallhythe Road			8 May 1950	TQ8888931595; 51°03′09″N 0°41′37″E		1071161	Upload Photo	Q26326122
Priest's House	II*	Smallhythe Road			8 May 1950	TQ8934230146; 51°02′22″N 0°41′58″E	Continuously jettied house, built after the fire of 1514	1281677	Priest's House More images	Q17556849
Ratsbury	II	Smallhythe Road			8 May 1950	TQ8881432156; 51°03′28″N 0°41′35″E		1281673	Upload Photo	Q26570696
Smallhythe Place	II*	Smallhythe Road			8 May 1950	TQ8934229997; 51°02′17″N 0°41′58″E	Continuously jettied house	1071163	Smallhythe Place More images	Q7543679
The Cedars	II*	Smallhythe Road			8 May 1950	TQ8805632911; 51°03′53″N 0°40′57″E		1071121	Upload Photo	Q17556124
Tile Cottage	II	Smallhythe Road			8 May 1950	TQ8795932994; 51°03′56″N 0°40′52″E		1071164	Upload Photo	Q26326127
Yew Tree Cottage	II	Smallhythe Road			8 June 1972	TQ8932029980; 51°02′17″N 0°41′56″E		1071123	Yew Tree Cottage More images	Q26326042
Tenterden Museum	II	Station Road			8 June 1972	TQ8818533304; 51°04′06″N 0°41′04″E		1281621	Upload Photo	Q26570652
Barn At Ingleden	II	Swain Road			8 June 1972	TQ8992234835; 51°04′53″N 0°42′36″E		1071125	Upload Photo	Q26326046
Brissenden Farmhouse	II	Swain Road			8 June 1972	TQ9068134662; 51°04′47″N 0°43′15″E		1071124	Upload Photo	Q26326043
Ingleden	II	Swain Road			8 June 1972	TQ8988534855; 51°04′54″N 0°42′35″E		1203607	Upload Photo	Q26499126
2, 3 And 4, Theatre Square	II	2, 3 And 4, Theatre Square			8 June 1972	TQ8843433283; 51°04′05″N 0°41′17″E		1362812	Upload Photo	Q26644678
Plummer	II	Plummer Lane			8 May 1950	TQ8754532603; 51°03′44″N 0°40′30″E		1362825	Upload Photo	Q26644690
2, West Cross	II	2, West Cross			8 May 1950	TQ8800233138; 51°04′00″N 0°40′55″E		1203617	Upload Photo	Q26499136
8, West Cross	II	8, West Cross			8 June 1972	TQ8795333120; 51°04′00″N 0°40′52″E		1203625	Upload Photo	Q26499144
9, West Cross	II	9, West Cross			8 April 1970	TQ8798633094; 51°03′59″N 0°40′54″E		1071126	Upload Photo	Q26326047
10, West Cross	II	10, West Cross			8 June 1972	TQ8793733110; 51°04′00″N 0°40′51″E		1362814	Upload Photo	Q26644680
The William Caxton Inn	II	11, West Cross			8 April 1970	TQ8796133084; 51°03′59″N 0°40′52″E		1362813	Upload Photo	Q26644679
Westfield House	II*	18, West Cross			8 May 1950	TQ8791033109; 51°04′00″N 0°40′50″E		1071128	Upload Photo	Q17556128
3 And 5, West Cross	II	3 And 5, West Cross			8 April 1970	TQ8801033103; 51°03′59″N 0°40′55″E		1281594	Upload Photo	Q26570627
4 And 6, West Cross	II	4 And 6, West Cross			8 June 1972	TQ8798633130; 51°04′00″N 0°40′54″E		1071127	Upload Photo	Q26326050
Gatehouse	II	West Cross			18 May 1987	TQ8791933071; 51°03′58″N 0°40′50″E		1277084	Upload Photo	Q26566541
Craythorne	II	Woodchurch Road			8 May 1950	TQ8897133782; 51°04′20″N 0°41′46″E		1203630	Upload Photo	Q26499149
Dovenden	II	Woodchurch Road			8 June 1972	TQ8919033927; 51°04′25″N 0°41′57″E		1071129	Upload Photo	Q26326054
Old Knockwood	II*	Woodchurch Road			8 May 1950	TQ8972634276; 51°04′35″N 0°42′25″E		1071130	Upload Photo	Q17556138
Stace House	II	Woodchurch Road			8 May 1950	TQ8900533739; 51°04′19″N 0°41′47″E		1203636	Upload Photo	Q26499155

== See also ==
- Grade I listed buildings in Kent
- Grade II* listed buildings in Kent

== Sources ==
- Newman, John (2012) [1969], Kent: West and the Weald, The Buildings of England, New Haven and London: Yale University Press, ISBN 978-0-300-18509-6
