= Graham Kerr =

British television chef (born 1934)

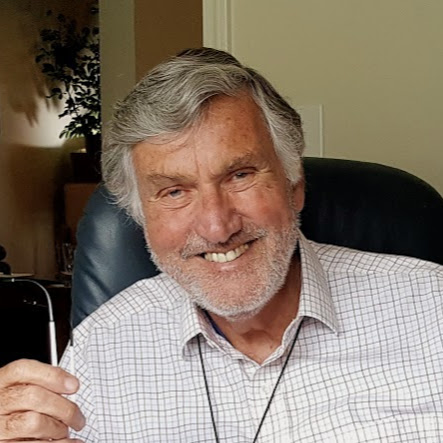
- Kerr in January 2018
- Born: 22 January 1934 (age 92); London, England
- Education: Michael Hall; Brighton Technical College; South Devon College
- Spouse: Treena Kerr (m. 1955; died 2015)
- Culinary career
- Television shows
- The Galloping Gourmet (1968–72); Graham Kerr's Kitchen (1994–96)

Graham Victor Kerr (/kɛər/ KAIR; born 22 January 1934) is a British cooking personality who is best known for his television cooking show The Galloping Gourmet, which aired from 30 December 1968 to 14 September 1972.

== Early life ==
Kerr was born in Brondesbury, north London. His Scottish parents, Major John Douglas Kerr and his wife were hoteliers at the Dorset Arms in East Grinstead, West Sussex, England, then at Alexandra Hotel, St Leonards-on-Sea, East Sussex.

On the pronunciation of his family name, Kerr wrote in The Graham Kerr Cookbook that "my name is pronounced 'care' – not 'cur', as in the case of Bill Kerr and not 'car', as in the case of Deborah Kerr," respectively.

As a youth, he attended Michael Hall, a Waldorf school at Kidbrooke Park in Forest Row, East Sussex. In 1945, Kerr met Treena Van Doorne, later, his wife, at Michael Hall.

Although he dropped out of school at age 14 and began training in kitchens, he returned years later and attended Brighton Technical College and South Devon College.

== Career ==
=== Early career ===
Kerr became trainee manager at the Roebuck Hotel in Forest Row, East Sussex, when he was 15 years old. He did national service in the British Army and received a short service commission in the Army Catering Corps in 1954. After five years in the British Army, rising to lieutenant, he became general manager of the Royal Ascot Hotel.

=== New Zealand and Entertaining with Kerr ===
Kerr moved to New Zealand in 1958, becoming chief catering adviser for the Royal New Zealand Air Force.

He moved into television in New Zealand when being recruited by TVNZ producer Shirley Maddock. In 1961, he began hosting the television show Entertaining with Kerr, in which he appeared dressed in military uniform. His recipes were also delivered on radio and in magazines, and the first edition of a related book, Entertaining with Kerr, was sold out in eight days. During these early years Kerr won a Penguin Award as "Personality of the Year."

=== Australia ===
Shortly after the TVNZ series was launched, promoter Anthony Hollows introduced Kerr to his business partner, rising New Zealand entertainment promoter and artist manager Harry M. Miller. Miller was at first sceptical of taking Kerr on, having just lost heavily on a disastrous promotion of a folk music concert, but Hollows was insistent, and after seeing Kerr in action, Miller immediately saw his potential. Miller (who was well established across the Tasman Sea as a concert promoter) was confident that he could launch Kerr in Australia. Kerr signed on as Miller's first management client, and the relationship proved enormously important and financially rewarding to both men. Miller was instrumental in launching Kerr in Australia, and Kerr's breakthrough in turn laid the foundation for Miller's own success as a leading player in the Australian and New Zealand entertainment industry over the next 20 years.

In 1964, Kerr moved to Sydney, and through his Australian contacts, Miller was soon able to sign Kerr to present a regular cooking show on Channel 10, also called Entertaining with Kerr, as part of the TEN Network, Australia's recently established third commercial television outlet. Although Kerr's initial fee was modest, Miller wisely balanced that against the value of the exposure, certain that Kerr would make an impact. The show quickly became a huge national success, leading to daily radio spots, newspaper and magazine columns, personal appearances, and lucrative product endorsements. Miller also cited winemaker and critic Len Evans as being especially helpful to Kerr in these early days. Miller soon scored another coup when he signed the multinational food company Nestlé as Kerr's first major sponsor.

At some point, Kerr's television ratings took a dive, and the series was cancelled. However, his radio show continued. On the recommendation of the wife of a board member, who listened to Kerr's radio show, the Australian Dairy Board signed Kerr to what Miller described as an endorsement contract "of staggering proportions," and Kerr was soon back on national television.

In his autobiography, My Story, Miller recounted that "the sweetest contract I offered Graham was one he refused to sign." In the mid-1960s, Union Carbide, the manufacturers of Glad Wrap, approached Miller with a lucrative offer for Kerr to become its national endorser. All Kerr had to do was make a few commercials, pose for a few photos, and use the product on his cooking show. Sensing the huge potential of the new product, Miller cannily negotiated for a multiyear contract in which Kerr was to receive a royalty of about 0.5c on every unit sold instead of a flat fee. To Miller's astonishment, however, Kerr was unimpressed by Glad Wrap, and despite Miller's strenuous effort to demonstrate its enormous usefulness, Kerr remained unconvinced.

=== Canada and The Galloping Gourmet ===
Miller and Kerr parted ways in the late 1960s after Kerr received a lucrative offer from Fremantle of Canada. Although his management contract with Miller still had several years to run, Kerr and Miller agreed to a negotiated buy-out; the two parted ways amicably, and remained good friends.

Kerr's new series for Fremantle of Canada, The Galloping Gourmet (30 December 1968–September 14, 1972) was named for his onscreen persona. It was recorded in Ottawa at CJOH-TV and produced by his wife Treena Kerr. The origin of his Galloping Gourmet persona stemmed from The Galloping Gourmets, a 1967 book he co-authored with wine expert Len Evans. The nickname was the result of a 35-day worldwide trek to the finest restaurants around the globe. The show was taped in front of a live audience. The title was echoed in the opening of each episode, where Kerr entered the stage area by running in and leaping over a chair in the dining room set (a stunt conceived by Treena). Many episodes featured a prerecorded segment with Kerr in a part of the world wherein that episode's dish originated.

The series was known for its lighthearted humour, tomfoolery, and the copious use of clarified butter, cream, and fat. A famous line of Kerr's on the show was his response to someone's criticism of his cooking: "Madam, you could go outside and get run over by a bus, and just think what you would have missed!" He also liberally featured wine, serving it with most meals, using it in his dishes, and waxing poetic about its virtues. He would also raise a glass of wine to his lips (which he referred to as a "short slurp") as a cue to the director to cut to commercials, then would bring it back up to his lips right before the show came back on. This gave the impression to some viewers that he was drinking heavily during the taping. In reality, he drank very little.

In an ongoing feature of the show, Kerr would make his way into the audience as the closing credits began and select an audience member (usually female) whom he would invite onstage with him to enjoy whatever dish he had just prepared. Another recurring feature at the end of each show would be a close-up of Kerr as he sampled the dish he had just cooked. To "oohs and ahs" from the audience, he would pull a face as though he was in ecstasy from tasting his latest creation.

The Galloping Gourmet was a hit, and earned two Emmy Award nominations. During its run, Kerr became a worldwide sensation and wrote an abundance of cookbooks. However, he was pilloried by many of the elite of the food world of the time, including influential food writer Michael Field, who called Kerr "the Liberace of the food world", and James Beard, who wrote that Kerr "has very little respect for food."

The show was dubbed in French and aired on Télévision de Radio-Canada starting 6 September 1971, under the title Le Gourmet farfelu.

From 1969 to 1972 Kerr also made guest appearances on Monitor, a long-running NBC radio variety programme.

=== Personal setbacks, born-again Christianity and Take Kerr ===
Some near-tragedies caused Kerr to suspend his television career, thus ending the show. In April 1971, Kerr and his wife Treena were involved in a car crash in California. As a result of the accident, he suffered a dislocated spine and a weakened left arm. As therapy, Kerr wore a 1 lb (0.45 kg) bracelet to strengthen the weakened arm. In January 1972, Treena was at first diagnosed with lung cancer. That diagnosis turned out to be incorrect; it was later determined she had tuberculosis. Although a part of a lung was removed, she made a full recovery. However, she became addicted to painkillers as well as several other medications.

In 1975, Treena became a born-again Christian after being encouraged by an employee; Kerr also became religious at the same time.

Kerr returned to television in 1975 with a daily syndicated five-minute series, Take Kerr, which featured a particular recipe for each show. This programme reflected his newfound embrace of both Christianity and healthful eating, with lighter-calorie recipes and Christian elements, including the use of the hymn "This Is the Day the Lord Has Made" as a theme song. The programme lasted four series. One Christian element on the show, an inclusion of a passage from the Bible in the closing credits, was strongly resisted by one of the stations on which the show aired, and indirectly caused Kerr to lose millions of dollars in potential revenue owing to his unwillingness to compromise. This series was later repeated on CNN during its first year or two.

In a 1975 interview publicising Take Kerr, Kerr renounced the show The Galloping Gourmet, saying that "What I did wasn't art, it was a crime," given the increasing rate of obesity in the United States. He also apologised for two of his trademarks on that show, his wine drinking and his double entendres. He stated that he was trying to convince TV stations to remove reruns of the show from syndication.

=== Minimax, The Graham Kerr Show, and Graham Kerr's Kitchen ===
After his wife Treena's stroke, then heart attack in 1986, Kerr was prompted to create a new style of cooking that he dubbed "Minimax." This new method of food preparation minimised ("Mini-") fat and cholesterol while it maximised ("-max") aroma, colour, texture, and taste. Minimax led to The Graham Kerr Show, originally produced at KING-TV in Seattle and later syndicated to local stations during the 1990–91 season, followed by a run on the Discovery Channel. From 1992 to 1995, Kerr starred on the PBS show Graham Kerr's Kitchen, which again embraced the low-fat, "minimax" approach.

Minimax also led to three successful cookbooks: Graham Kerr's Smart Cooking, Graham Kerr's Minimax Cookbook, and Graham Kerr's Creative Choices (A Minimax Book) along with corresponding series on public television: Graham Kerr's Kitchen, Graham Kerr's Swiftly Seasoned, and The Best of Graham Kerr.

Graham Kerr was distributed by MTM Enterprises.

=== Career since 1995 ===
In 1995, he appeared in Cooking in Concert: Julia Child & Graham Kerr, a PBS TV special with Julia Child.

In 1996, Kerr, in his book of that year called Swiftly Seasoned, created the concept of a "Moulded Ethnic Vegetable," a baked combination of starches and vegetables seasoned with flavours characteristic of different ethnic cuisines. The "MEV," as he referred to it in recipes, was intended to remedy what he perceived as a lack of focus in vegetarian meals; according to Kerr, while omnivorous cuisine generally has a central focus in a meat dish, vegetarian plates are often little more than collections of side dishes, and the MEV was an attempt to provide a central focus for such meals. The MEV was not a widely successful concept, and a business venture to manufacture and sell a muffin tin–like MEV baking pan was not successful. (While it was generally intended to be vegetarian, Kerr did incorporate meats into some MEV recipes in later books.)

From 1996 to 2000, Kerr was also the editor-at-large for Cooking Light magazine.

Since the late 1990s, Graham Kerr appeared in a series of radio and television features for the 5 A Day programme of the United States National Cancer Institute, called Do Yourself a Flavor, emphasising the use of fruits and vegetables in recipes. Kerr's earlier series, including The Galloping Gourmet, has aired in the U.S. on Food Network and Cooking Channel. He has worked with Bastyr University and many businesses looking for innovation, better health and good taste.

In 1997–98, Kerr recorded a series The Gathering Place in Toronto. A total of 130 one-hour episodes were recorded. The series featured guests who were prominent authorities in various health fields. Kerr included videos shot on location on a worldwide voyage aboard the ship Queen Elizabeth 2 (QE2).

Kerr's autobiography Flash of Silver...the leap that changed my world was published in 2015.

== Awards and accolades ==
In 1965, Kerr was awarded the gold medal at the Culinary Olympics in Frankfurt, Germany, for The Graham Kerr Cookbook by the Galloping Gourmet.

In 2003, he received an honorary doctorate for culinary arts and nutrition from Johnson & Wales University in Providence, Rhode Island. Also in 2003, Kerr was awarded an Honorary Life Member of the American Dietetic Association.

== Influence ==
Celebrity chefs Emeril Lagasse and Charlie Trotter, as well as John Williams, the Executive Chef at the Ritz, have all stated that they were fans of The Galloping Gourmet as children.

== Personal life ==
Having first met when they were both around 11 years old, Kerr married Treena Van Doorne, an English actress, on 22 September 1955, at St Mildred's Church in Tenterden, Kent, where Kerr's parents had a pub called The Woolpack. They had three children together. Treena Kerr died on 17 September 2015, five days before their 60th wedding anniversary.

Kerr resided in Mount Vernon, Washington, for several years. He moved to a retirement home in Warm Beach, Washington, in 2015, and tours the area. Kerr remarried in 2024.

He is a Christian.

== Works ==
- Kerr, G. (1963). Entertaining with Kerr. Wellington: A.H. and A.W. Reed
- Kerr, G. (1966). The Graham Kerr Cookbook. Wellington: A.H. and A.W. Reed (this cookbook was released in a distinctive spiral binding, with heavy covers)
- Kerr, G., & Evans, L. (1967). The galloping gourmets. Sydney: A.H. & A.W. Reed.
- Kerr, G. (1969). The Graham Kerr cookbook, by the galloping gourmet. Garden City, New York: Doubleday.
- Kerr, G. (1970). The Galloping Gourmet's Kitchen Diary.
- Kerr, G. (1972). The complete galloping gourmet cookbook. New York: Grosset & Dunlap.
- Kerr, G. (Early 1970s). A Festive Occasion, Just For You (a record album). Fremantle Records.
- Kerr, G. (1976). The new seasoning. New York: Simon & Schuster / Fleming H. Revell.
- Kerr, G. (1978). The love feast: How good, natural, wholesome food can create a warm and lasting Christian family. New York: Simon & Schuster / Fleming H. Revell.
- Kerr, G., & Kerr, T. (1982). The Graham Kerr Step By Step Cookbook. David C. Cook Publishing Company.
- Kerr, G. (1991). Graham Kerr's smart cooking. New York: Doubleday.
- Kerr, G. (1992). Graham Kerr's minimax cookbook. New York: Doubleday.
- Kerr, G. (1994). Graham Kerr's kitchen. New York: G.P. Putnam's.
- Kerr, G. (1995). Graham Kerr's best: A low fat, heart healthy cookbook. New York: G.P. Putnam's.
- Kerr, G. (1996). Graham Kerr's swiftly seasoned. New York: G.P. Putnam's.
- Kerr, G. (1997). The gathering place: Informal international menus that bring family and friends back to the table. Stanwood, WA: Camano Press.
- Kerr, G. (2002). The gathering place: Featuring Nutrient-Rich Comfort Food. Quarry Press.
- Kerr, G., & Suzanne, B. (2004). Graham Kerr's simply splenda cookbook. Alexandria, VA: Small Steps Press.
- Kerr, G., & Kerr, T. (2004). Charting a course to wellness: Creative ways of living with heart disease and diabetes. Alexandria, VA: American Diabetes Association.
- Kerr, G., & Kerr, T. (2006). Recipe For Life.
- Kerr, T., & Kerr, G. (2007). Day by Day Gourmet Cookbook. Broadman & Holman.
- Kerr, G., (2010). Growing at the Speed of Life Putnam.
- Kerr, G., (2015). Flash of Silver...the leap that changed my world. Stanwood, WA: Camano Press..

=== Television Cookbooks ===
In addition, seven volumes of Television Cookbooks, featuring recipes from The Galloping Gourmet series, were published from 1969 to 1971 by Fremantle International, the show's syndicator. Four versions were known to exist—a regular version and three additional versions released in conjunction with KABC-TV in Los Angeles, CBC Television in Canada, and the BBC in Britain. The Fremantle and KABC versions were hardcover, and the CBC and BBC versions, though identical in content, were softcover and GBC–bound, with different covers (with the BBC version under the title Entertaining with Kerr). These cookbooks were generally sold by mail order through the television series.

In 1972, the cookbooks were re-released with new colour covers and sold in bookshops. This new version was sold by Paperback Library but, despite the publisher's name, the books were hardcover.

== See also ==
- List of New Zealand television personalities
