= Agnes Grebill =

English Lollard martyr (died 1511)

Agnes Grebill of Tenterden (died 1511) was an English Lollard martyr from Kent.

== Biography ==
Information about Grebill's life mostly comes from evidence given against her by members of her own family during her heresy trial in 1511.

Her husband was a weaver who worked in Tenterden and Benenden, Kent. When Grebill was about thirty she was converted to Lollard beliefs by the teachings of John Ive and William Carder. Grebill and her husband later instructed their sons (John Grebill and Christopher Grebill) in Lollardy and were central figures in a network of those with Lollard beliefs in the county of Kent. In line with Lollard beliefs, Grebill was anticlerical and felt that confession could only be good if "made to a priest being the follower of Peter and being pure and clean in life."

In 1511, Grebill was brought to trial before Archbishop William Warham of Canterbury, along with her husband and sons, accused of heretical beliefs. When tried, she was at least sixty years old. Grebill was the only member of her family who refused to recant, and her husband and one of their sons later testified against her.

Archbishop Warham pronounced Grebill an "obstinate heretic." She was handed over to the secular courts and was burned at the stake, dying alongside four other female Lollards.
