= Len Evans (wine) =

English-born Australian promoter, maker, judge, taster, teacher and drinker of wine

Leonard Paul Evans AO OBE (31 August 1930 – 17 August 2006) was an English-born Australian promoter, maker, judge, taster, teacher and drinker of wine. The Oxford Companion to Wine writes that he did "... more to advance the cause of wine in Australia than any other individual." Others have referred to him as "the godfather of the Australian wine industry" and "Australia's leading ambassador of wine."

== Biography ==
Evans was born in Felixstowe, England, of Welsh parents and was educated at Framlingham College. He migrated to New Zealand in 1953, then to Australia in 1955. After various experiences, he started Australia's first wine column in 1962 in The Bulletin, he was the founding director of the Australian Wine Bureau (1965), and he wrote the first major encyclopedia of Australian wine (1973). He was one of the first leaders to recognise that the future of Australian wine lay in table wines rather than in the sweet fortified wines in which the country then specialized.

In 1967, Evans co-authored a book with expert gourmet Graham Kerr, The Galloping Gourmets. The two got their nickname from a 35-day worldwide trek to the finest restaurants around the globe. The Galloping Gourmet persona, however, became more associated with Kerr, who would later host a globally syndicated cooking show, The Galloping Gourmet.

Evans was chairman of Rothbury Wines since its founding in 1969 until 1996, and Petaluma from 1978 until 1992. He was chairman of Evans Wine Company since 1996, Evans Family Wines from 1980 and Tower Estate since its founding in 1998. Tower Estate and lodge is now owned by Michael Hope, owner of the adjacent Hope Estate amongst other wineries and vineyards throughout Australia.

Len Evans transformed the blind tasting of wine into a competition sport through his creating and developing the Options Game in which competitors attempt to identify wines. Unlike other blind tastings, the Options Game consists of multiple choice questions, which gives less experienced tastings a chance at doing well in the competition.

Because of his achievements, he received many awards, including the Epicurean Award for services to the Wine and Food Industry, the Charles Heidsieck Award for Wine Writing, Personalité de l'Année, (1986) Paris (Oenology section – Gastronomy), Chevalier de l'Ordre Merite Agricole (French government), first life member of the Society Of Wine Educators (1995), and elected member of the College of Patrons of the Australian Wine Industry, Restaurant Association Hall of Fame, Decanter' Magazine – International Award for "Man of the Year".

He was appointed an Officer of the Order of the British Empire in the 1982 Birthday Honours and an Officer of the Order of Australia in 1999.

After a history of heart disease dating from 1976, Len Evans died of a heart attack on 17 August 2006, in Newcastle, New South Wales.

== Writing on wine ==
Len Evans felt that it was important that wine be demystified, and that an appreciation and basic understanding of it be available to everyone, not just to an educated elite. To this end, he wrote a column for wine in The Australian Women's Weekly for years, discussing various wines, usually very reasonably priced, in an open, relatively jargon-free manner. He was criticised for blatantly advocating for his own wines, although he defended himself by referring to himself primarily as a wine producer.

== Legacy ==
On Friday 12 September 2014 the Len Evans Memorial Lookout was unveiled by his widow Trish. The lookout, commemorating the immense contribution Len made to the Australian wine industry, is located in the heart of his beloved Hunter Valley at Constable Estate.

== See also ==
- List of wine personalities
