= Tenterden Town Hall =

Municipal building in Tenterden, Kent, England

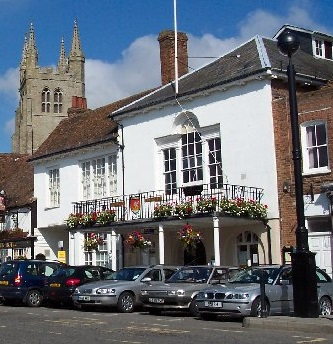
- Tenterden Town Hall

- Shown in Kent
- 51.0687°N 0.6880°E
- Location: High Street, Tenterden

History
- Built: 1792

Site notes
- Architectural style: Italianate style

Listed Building – Grade II
- Official name: The Town Hall
- Designated: 8 April 1970
- Reference no.: 1070343

Tenterden Town Hall is a municipal building in the High Street in Tenterden, Kent, England. The structure, which is the meeting place of Tenterden Town Council, is a Grade II listed building.

== History ==
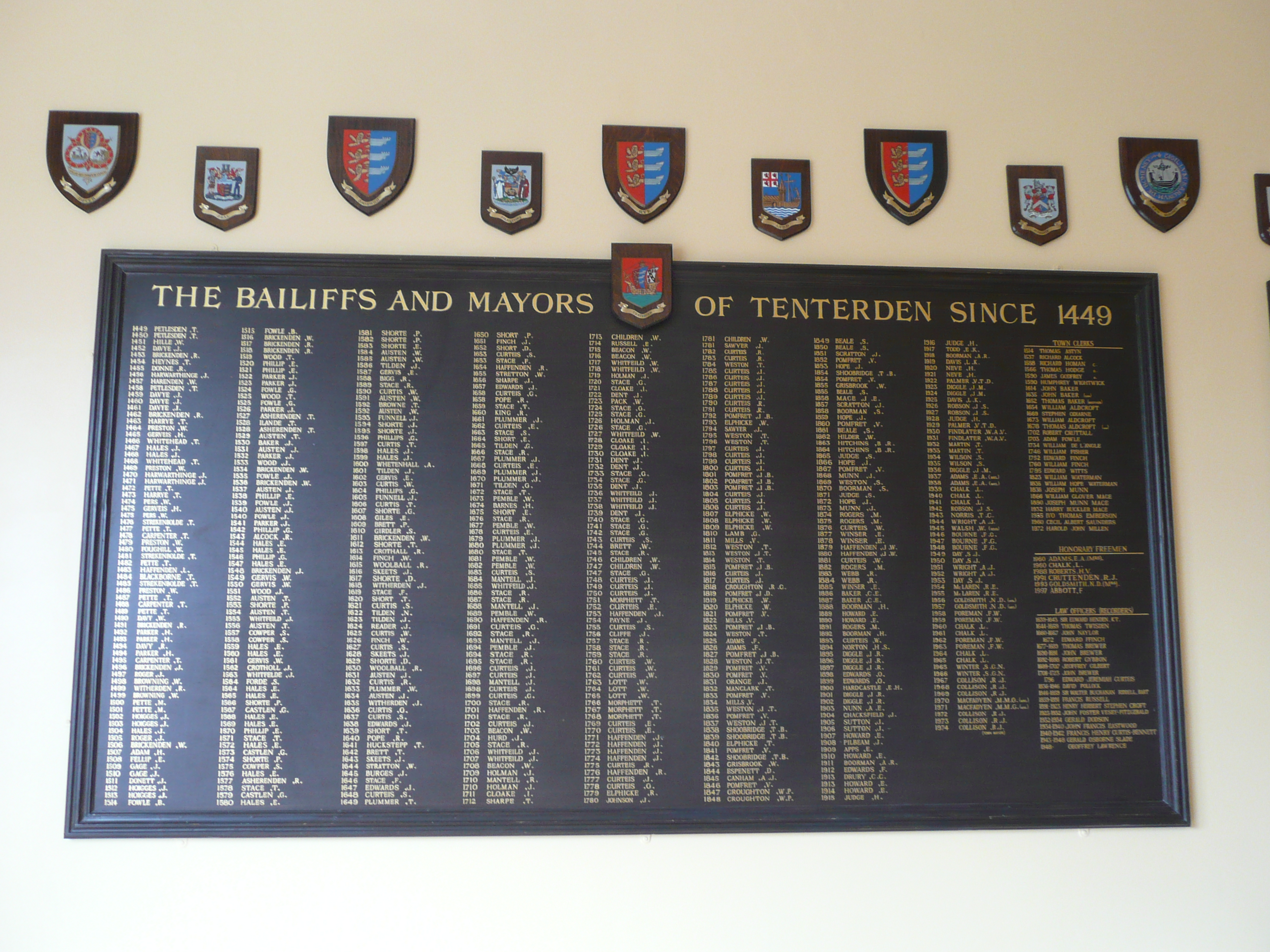
List of mayors in the assembly hall

The first municipal building in the town was a medieval court hall which was burnt down by an inmate who had been incarcerated in the debtors' cells in March 1661. The borough council subsequently met in public houses until, in the late 18th century, the civic leaders decided to commission a dedicated building. The site they selected was owned by John Samson, who also owned the Woolpack Inn. After the council had acquired a long lease on the right-hand section of the site, construction started in 1790. The new building was designed in the Italianate style, built in brick with a stucco finish at a cost of £1,000 and was completed in 1792.

The design involved a main frontage with five bays facing onto the High Street; the right-hand section, which was symmetrical, featured a doorway flanked by pilasters and by round headed openings with a prominent Venetian window on the first floor. The left-hand section featured a carriageway on the left and a three-part sash window on the right, while the first floor was fenestrated by a single sash window on the left and by a three-part sash window on the right. Internally, the rooms occupied by the council, which were in the right-hand section, were the grand jury room on the ground floor and the assembly hall on the first floor.

The roof of the building was repaired after it was badly damaged in a fire in September 1879, a balcony supported by four columns was installed in May 1912 and the freehold in the property was acquired in February 1922. The council secured ownership of the left-hand section of the building as well in October 1925, so allowing a mayor's parlour to be established on the first floor. The building was also extended to the north to create a town clerk's office in 1936 and it was refurbished, with the Venetian window being replaced, in 1973.

The town hall continued to serve as the headquarters of the borough council for much of the 20th century, but ceased to be the local seat of government when the enlarged Ashford Borough Council was formed in 1974. It subsequently became the meeting place of Tenterden Town Council as well as an approved venue for weddings and civil partnership ceremonies. In January 2021, the town council announced plans to carry out a comprehensive restoration of the building, which would include the replacement of the 1930s extension, to a design by local architects, Theis & Khan, at a proposed cost of £1.75 million.

Works of art in the town hall include a portrait by Lance Calkin of the member of parliament, Colonel James Palmer, a portrait by Daisy Radcliffe Beresford of Reverend Joseph Robert Diggle and a portrait by William Hoare of the master of Sunbury School, Samuel Curteis.
