= St Mildred's Church, Tenterden =

Cathedral church of Milan, Italy

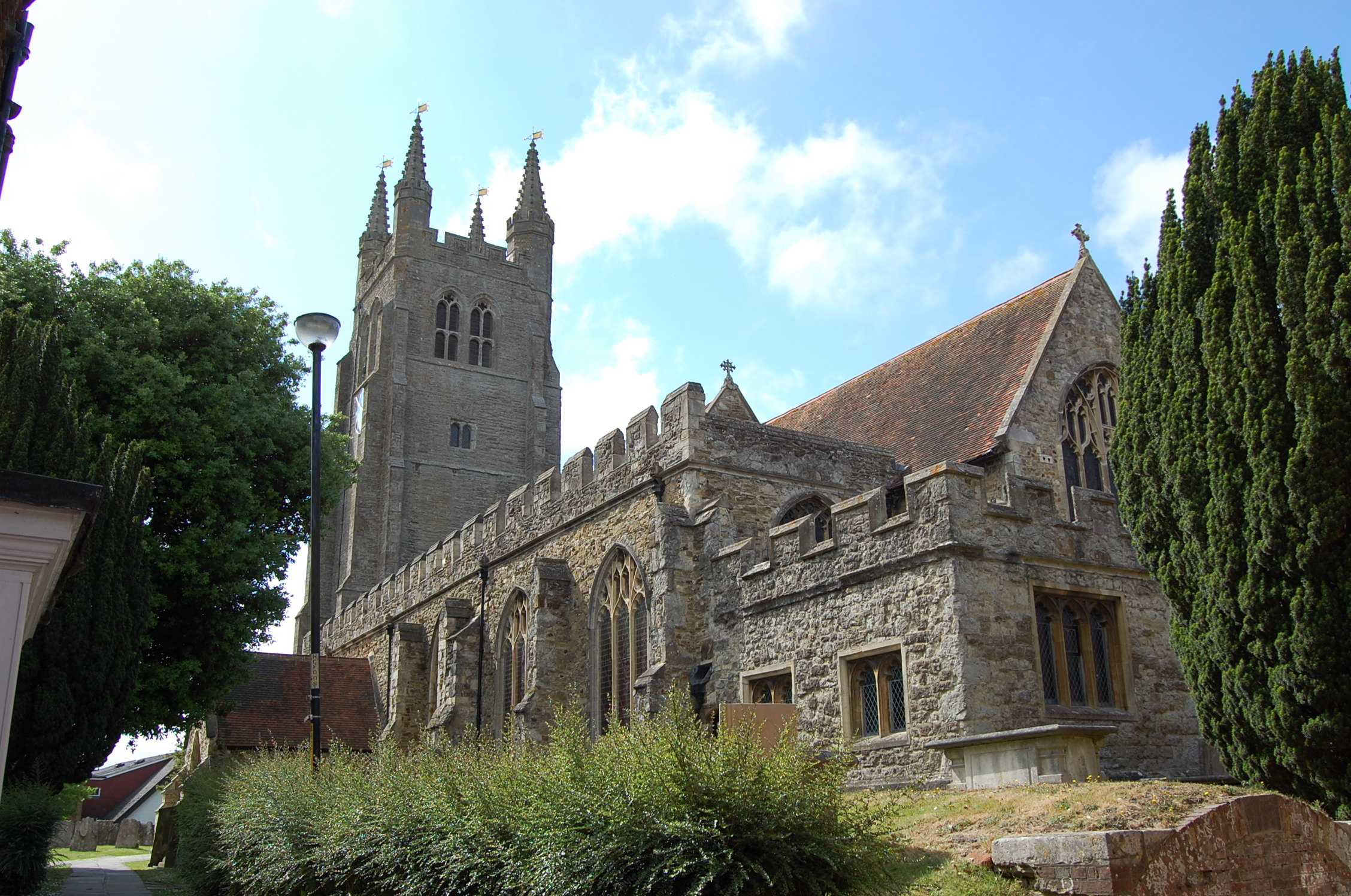
- The exterior of the church
- St Mildred's Church, Tenterden
- 51°4′7.57″N 0°41′13.6″E
- OS grid reference: TQ 88368 33372
- Location: Tenterden
- Country: England
- Denomination: Church of England
- Website: www.tentroxchurches.co.uk

Architecture
- Functional status: Active

St Mildred's Church is a Church of England parish church in Tenterden in the borough of Ashford in Kent, England.

The church dates from about the 12th century and is Grade I heritage listed. The main tower of the church is 39.6 metres (130 feet) high and was constructed in 1461. It is dedicated to a prominent Anglo-Saxon saint, Saint Mildred—a 7th-century princess who served as the abbess of the nunnery at Minster-in-Thanet.

== History ==
Construction of the church first began in the 12th Century and was expanded multiple times across the next few centuries. Most notably in 1461, when a steeple was added due to an influx of money from when Tenterden was at its height of the wool trade.

In 2016, the Tenterden, Rother and Oxney Benefice was formed that aimed to bring together the three parishes of the Tenterden Benefice (Tenterden, St Michael's and Smallhythe) and the six parishes of the Rother and Oxney Benefice (Appledore, Stone, Ebony, Wittersham, Newenden and Rolvenden).

== Interior ==
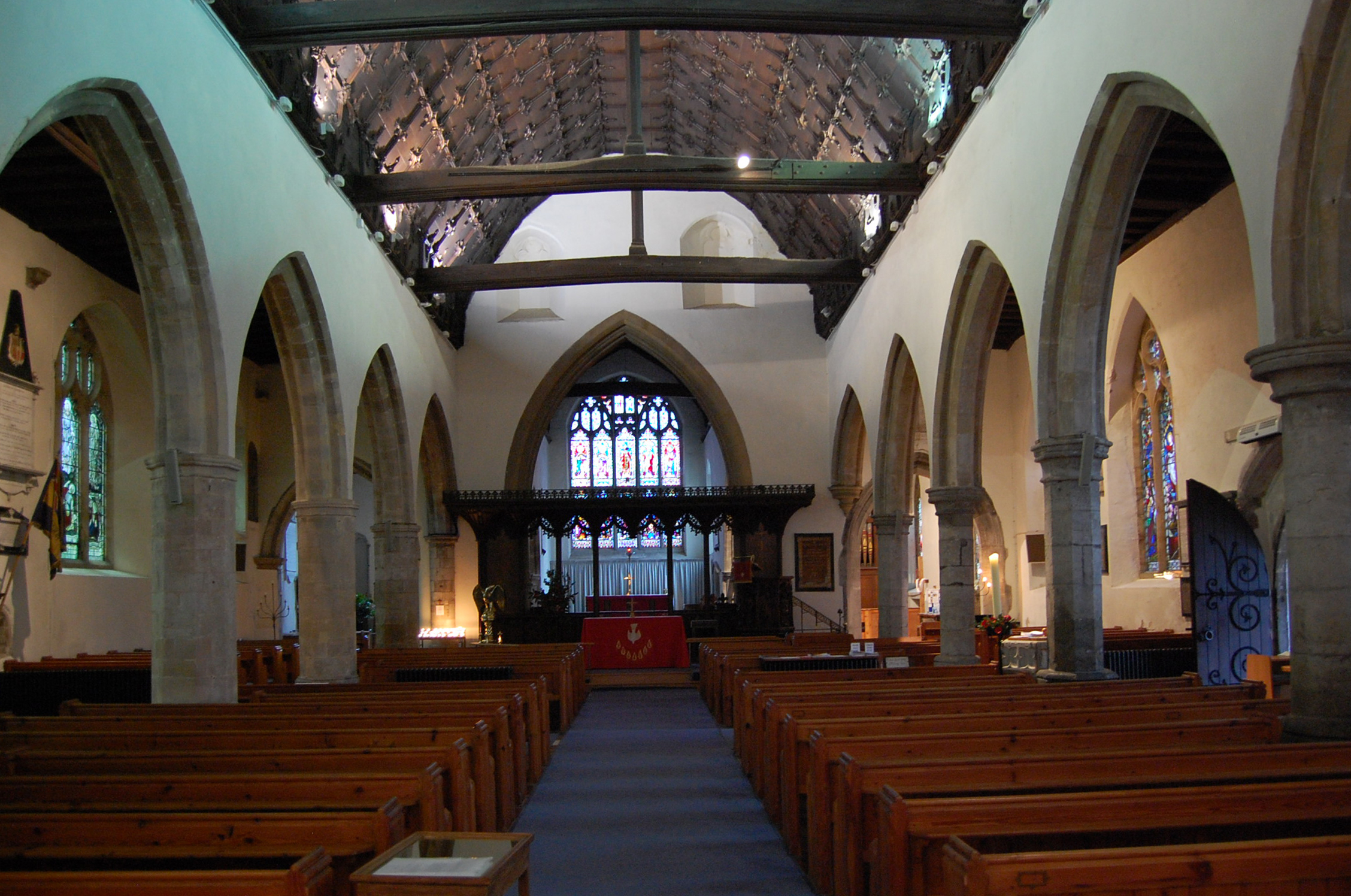
The interior of the church

The church features stained glasswork behind the altar and stained glass on the windows on the sides of the church. The nave features arches with marble pillars running along the sides of the wooden pews.

In more recent years the church was refurbished to now include glass doors at the front entrance, chairs instead of wooden pews and the repainting of the interior.

== Exterior ==
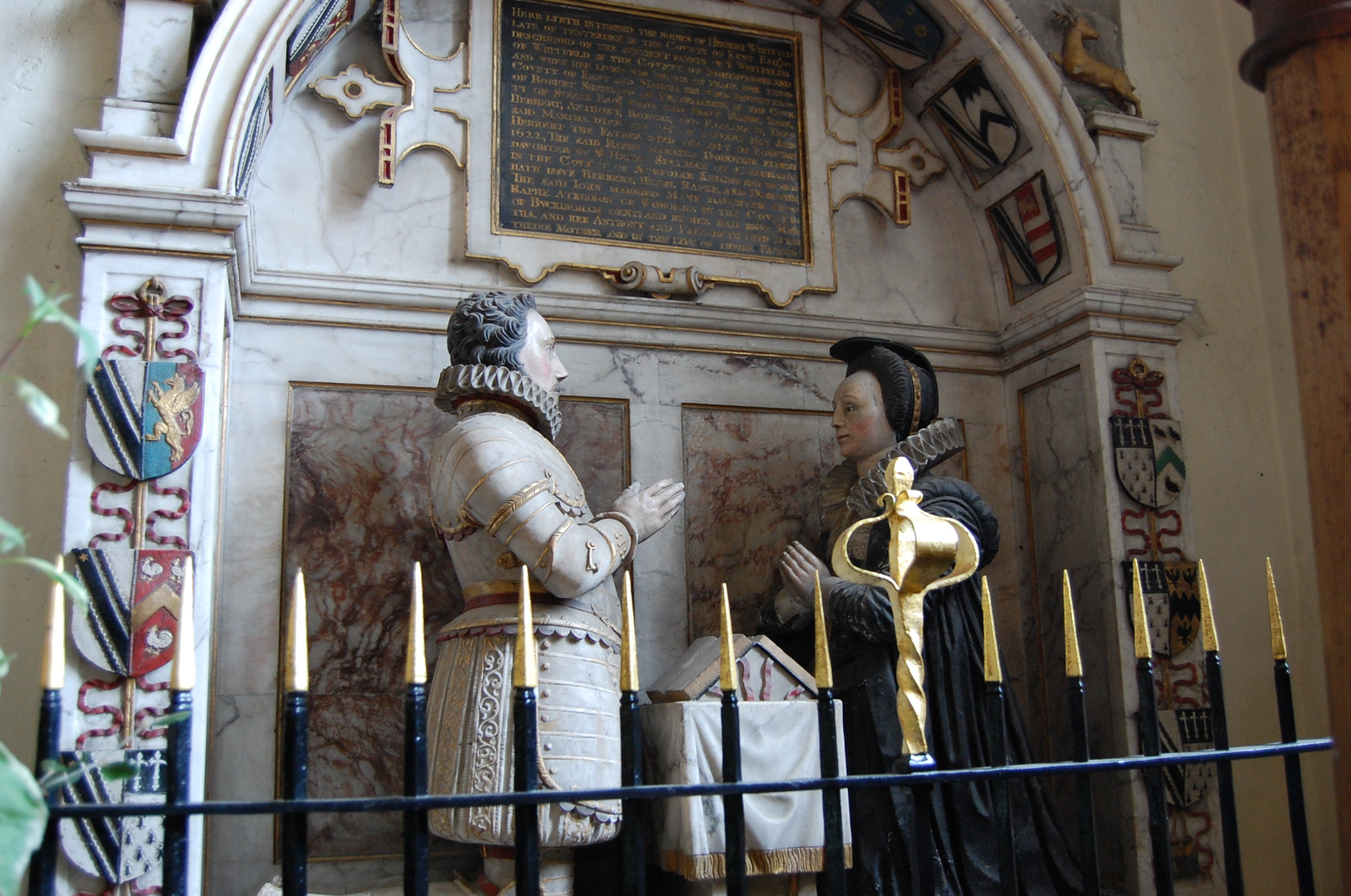
The Whitfield Memorial

The main tower of the church is built from Bethersden Marble, a limestone that contains thousands of brightly coloured shells.

A graveyard is also present on the left-hand side of the church.
