= Tenterden =

Town in Kent, England

Coordinates: 51.069620°N 0.689800°E

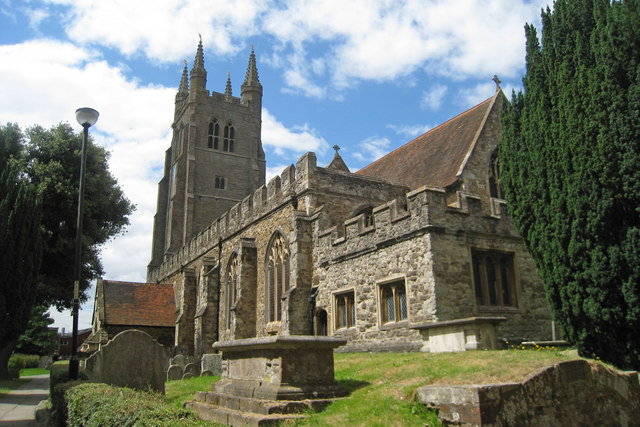
- St Mildred's Church

- Coat of Arms

- Location within Kent
- Area: 36.19 km^{2} (13.97 sq mi)
- Population: 8,186 (2021 Census)
  - Density: 226/km^{2} (590/sq mi)
- OS grid reference: TQ885334
- Civil parish: Tenterden
- District: Ashford
- Shire county: Kent
- Region: South East
- Country: England
- Sovereign state: United Kingdom
- Post town: TENTERDEN
- Postcode district: TN30
- Dialling code: 01580
- Police: Kent
- Fire: Kent
- Ambulance: South East Coast
- UK Parliament: Weald of Kent
- Website: www.tenterdentowncouncil.gov.uk

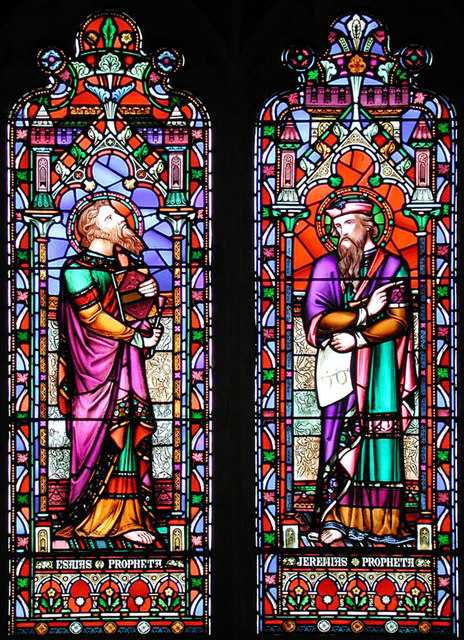
Window in St Mildred's Church

Tenterden is a town and civil parish in the Borough of Ashford in Kent, England. The town lies near to the High Weald National Landscape, approximately 15 miles (24 km) south-southeast of Maidstone, 22 miles (35 km) northeast of Canterbury, and 23 miles (37 km) west-southwest of Dover. The parish had a population of 8,186 at the 2021 census.

== Geography ==
Tenterden is connected to Kent's county town of Maidstone by the A262 road and the A274 road, and Ashford, Rolvenden and Hastings by the A28 road.

The town stands on the edge of the Weald, overlooking the valley of the River Rother. It is a member of the Cinque Ports Confederation, but due to seismic changes to the southern coast over the centuries, Tenterden is no longer by the sea.

== History ==
=== Early origins: Anglo-Saxon ===
Kent was one of the seven kingdoms of Anglo-Saxon England and the first to convert to Christianity. The earliest settlements had been made in the northern areas including Thanet. Uninhabited forest lands in the south, called Anderida or Andreasweald (known today as The Weald) provided glades and clearings for annual excursions, when people from the north grazed their pigs on the abundant acorns and nuts. In an early charter of 724 AD Æthelberht (son of King Wihtred of Kent) granted land in the wooded area around Romney Marsh and present-day Tenterden to Mildrith (Mildred), the Abbess of Thanet. With tidal waters nearby, the salted winter meat supplies could be returned up the coast via an easy sea journey. Thus, the origin of the town's name is two-fold, deriving from the Old English Tenetwara (the Men of Thanet) and the word den (a clearing within a forest). The first known reference to Tenetwara is found in a Charter of 968; it records Heronden pastureland granted by a lady Aethelflaed to Aelfwold for the sum of 1450 pence.

In Thanet abbey in the seventh century, Domne Æfa the royal abbess was succeeded by her daughter Mildred, whose life became legendary; she was beloved throughout Kent and beyond, and sanctified. Today Tenterden's Anglican church of St Mildred's is a Grade I heritage listed building standing majestically on high ground. It's likely that an early wooden Jutish church dedicated to her was situated on the same high spot. During the pre-Conquest period, the records for St Augustine's Abbey show Tenterden and other local villages paying the fee for the annual supply of holy oil to the church. By 1178/9 we have the first recorded use of the town's name as "Tentwardene" appearing in a Pipe Roll of Henry II. The earliest reference to a church in Tenterden is from the same date.

=== 11th–12th centuries ===
After 1027 the Thanet Minster estates were acquired by St Augustine's Abbey, Canterbury, which had also received from Minster the famed relics of St Mildred. There is no mention of the town in the Domesday Book because Tenterden being a 'den', its listing was in the lands of the parent Abbey. Bishop Odo of Bayeux, the half-brother of William the Conqueror, having become the Second Earl of Kent, owned land in this area.

From the mid-twelfth century the low lying land to the south of Tenterden, the Rother Levels and the Romney Marsh, were used for arable farming. With the arrival of the Black Death and loss of population, the collapse of labour intensive farming was matched by a growth in sheep farming on the rich marshy pastures. The production of raw wool brought prosperity to the town.

=== 13th century ===
From the time of the Jutes, Kent had been divided into areas of land known as Lathes, which in turn were subdivided into Hundreds. The first mention of Tenterden is within the Lathe of Scray, which covered part of the parish of Ebony and Reading Street: this appeared in 1241 when the town was recorded as one of the seven Hundreds located in the Weald. In 1279 several illicitly erected butchers' shops near to the church (probably temporary structures or shammels) were recorded as causing an encroachment on to the King's Highway. Having been cleared by a jury, the shopkeepers were permitted to stay on annual payment of a rent of twelve horseshoes. A further seven shops were also required to pay a levy. Today numbers 28 to 40 in the High Street occupy this 'shambles' site, on the southern edge of the church. The first mention of a dwelling in the town dates from 1275 and occurs in a Hundred Roll of King Edward l, when a Thomas Pittlesden was recorded as living at the manor house. In subsequent years the Pittlesden family remained as core to Tenterden's development, with their arms still featuring on the town's Coat of Arms.

=== 14th century ===
In 1305, Edward I happened to be staying at Sissinghurst; he had banned from the Court his son Prince Edward (the future Edward II) for poor behaviour. The Prince brought his beloved (and notorious) companion Piers Gaveston with him to stay nearby in Pittlesden Manor. From here some of Edward's letters survive, in which he both complains to his father of boredom in the area and implores him for leniency.

In the mid-fourteenth century King Edward III, in attempts to control smuggling, prohibited both the export of unwashed wool and the import of finished cloth. Consequently, Flemish weavers settled in the Weald. Tenterden and some of its neighbours became important centres of the broadcloth manufacturing industry, expanding and producing triple the amount of cloth as previously.

=== 15th–17th centuries ===
The 15th century was a golden age for Tenterden. The town was wealthy, prosperous, and strategically important.

However, this was a time of religious turmoil. Following Henry Vlll's break in 1534 from the Catholic Church, the incidence of non-conformity grew significantly in the Tenterden area and indeed may have been substantial in earlier times. The town is considered one of the best English towns for a study of heterodox religion during this period. A desire for more freedom of worship saw great migrations to the New World early in the seventeenth century. Several prominent Tenterden families set sail for New England. In 1634 Nathaniel Tilden, once Mayor of Tenterden who had been baptised in St Mildred's, sailed on The Hercules with his wife, children and servants and settled in Scituate, Massachusetts. A century later, after the English Civil War, a Unitarian congregation was established in the town and by 1746 a simple and dignified chapel had been erected on the Ashford Road. Similarly, a Baptist Chapel in Bells Lane had been built, reflecting further the religious non-conformity of many of the local populace.

During the 16th century the tidal waters at Smallhythe slowly receded and the port community declined. In 1600 Queen Elizabeth l granted the town a new Charter, in which an updated role of mayor was installed to replace that of the medieval bailiff. Sadly In 1661 the medieval Court House (next to the present day White Lion) burnt down and many of the town's early official documents, including the original 1449 Cinque Ports Charter from Henry Vl, were destroyed.

=== 18th century ===
During this century a number of wealthy landowners built large houses both in the town and on its outskirts including Kench Hill, and Homewood, which today houses Homewood School and Sixth Form Centre; the town became more widely known. In 1756, Oliver Goldsmith the playwright, performed in 'Romeo and Juliet' in a theatre housed probably in Bell's Lane to "tolerable houses" (audiences), remarking that he would never think of Tenterden, "without tears of gratitude and respect". By 1794 another theatre would be established in the same area. Following the outbreak of Corn Riots in 1768 in the town and nearby Woodchurch, the Secretary at War ordered a detachment of soldiers to march to the aid of the magistrates if required. At the end of the century in 1798 with the threat of invasion by Napoleon Bonaparte, barracks were erected at Reading Street on high ground close to Barrack Farm.

Since 1449 the Bailiff and Jurats of Tenterden had the authority if required to inflict the death penalty on offenders. New gallows had been set up in 1705 outside the town at Gallows Green, with the last recorded hanging taking place in 1785 before a crowd of some 1000 spectators. 1790 saw the building of a new Town Hall – since the fire of 1661, town meetings had taken place in the Woolpack Inn.

=== 19th century ===
A visit by William Cobbett in 1823, led him to record Tenterden, with a population of around 2000 and flourishing cattle markets, as "a small market town and a singularly bright spot". At this time the town could show continuing improvements which include the benefit of gas street lighting introduced in 1840, the trees being planted in 1871 to line the High Street and clean piped water delivered by the Cranbrook Water Company towards the end of the century. In 1890 the traditional May Day Fair, which had been an annual event in the High Street, was moved to the new Recreation Ground. However not all in Tenterden shared the nineteenth century prosperity. Britain's victory in the Napoleonic Wars meant that naval blockades around the country were ended; the price of wheat collapsed due to cheap imports from Ukraine and the USA. This resulted in especially hard times for Tenterden agricultural workers. In the 1840's a second significant phase of emigration occurred, with these families seeking destinations both in the USA and in Australia. A 'Soup Kitchen' was established to help poor and hungry families - the building survives today in Jackson's Lane behind the High Street, with its inscribed date of 1875.

=== 20th century ===
In 1903, Tenterden Town railway station was opened, but later closed in 1954, but half of it reopened in 1974 as the Kent and East Sussex Railway. The route starts at Tenterden Town Station and finishes at Bodiam station, near Bodiam Castle. The main line track is planned to be extended to Robertsbridge (near Hastings) in East Sussex.

After the First World War, the once stagnant population of the town began to increase.

During the Battle of Britain from July to October 1940, planes of the Luftwaffe whilst escaping the RAF following raids over London, would lighten their loads over Tenterden and the surrounding countryside causing widespread destruction. These bombs were a mixture of incendiary and high explosive bombs. By 1944, before the invasion of France, troops from Canada, US, Australia, plus the Welsh Fusiliers were stationed in Tenterden with all their weapons and munitions. Such was their importance that Field Marshal Bernard Montgomery addressed these troops on Tenterden's Recreation Ground. After D-Day, the town and local villages were hit by multiple V-1 rockets, commonly referred to as Doodlebugs, which wrought considerable damage.

In 1974 a national reorganisation of local government meant that both Tenterden Borough and Tenterden Rural Councils ceased to exist; a new Town Council came under the administration of the newly formed Ashford Borough Council. The latter part of the twentieth century saw an expansion of the town through the building of a considerable number of housing developments which have resulted in a much enlarged population. Attractions such as the Kent & East Sussex Railway, Chapel Down Vineyard and Tenterden High Street itself bring thousands of visitors annually into the town.

=== 21st century ===
Tenterden Town Hall, a historic landmark in the High Street, is undergoing extensive renovation. The hall closed in early 2024, and the work is expected to take approximately two years.

== Confederation of Cinque Ports ==
=== Origin ===
The Confederation of Cinque Ports have played an important part in defining the traditions of England's history and the town of Tenterden. The origin of the Confederation can be traced back to Saxon Times, when certain fishing ports in the south-east were given special privileges in return for ship service to the King. The Normans extended this practice to the ports of Hastings, Romney, Hythe, Dover and Sandwich, alongside two ancient towns, Winchelsea and Rye.

In 1041, Edward the Confessor had set out his requirement to the south coast Portsmen, which was to use 20 of their ships, each with a crew of 21, for 15 days of service annually. Under William the Conqueror, his Charter (written to them in old French), coined the term "Cinque Ports" (but pronounced 'sink' ports); stated his requirement was 57 ships for 15 days annually. The 1155 Charter from Henry III had the same obligations but expanded on their benefits. These ports worked together in providing a fleet of ships for the Crown and protecting the south coast of England. The ships were also used for a lucrative cross-channel trade.

A more specific Charter of 1229 numbered the ships to be separately provided by each of the Confederation's Ports and that of 1278 set out a magnificently designed Flag: the three fighting English Lionships. Rye was obligated for five ships in 1392 and provided these with help from Tenterden shipwrights. If the Crown used the ships and the crews for longer periods – then the costs and wages became at the Crown's expense instead. In addition to providing ships and crews for sea battles at home and abroad, Portsmen fought in the king's armies and there were other obligations. The last time a Cinque Ports fleet sailed into action was in 1596, in response to a threatened Spanish invasion.

These Confederation ports continually guarded the southern coast which included defending English fishing rights, and monarchs had to be ferried back and forth across the Channel on an interesting variety of missions. Further costs were incurred for maintaining the trappings of the Confederation, which Tenterden was always ready to dispute its annual share of Rye's costs. There were ways to redress these costs; the town's officials made the most of their 'expense accounts' payable by Rye: typically ferry fares, fish meals, with ale and wine from the local inn. Claimants included one Thomas Caxton, brother to the renowned printer William Caxton – reputedly born in Tenterden.

=== Lord Warden ===
The Lord Warden of the Cinque Ports remains the "Keeper of the Coast" and notable holders of the post have included the William Pitt the Younger, Duke of Wellington, Sir Winston Churchill and Queen Elizabeth The Queen Mother. The Lord Warden is appointed by the sovereign, and since 1267 has also been Constable of Dover Castle.

In 1728, Lord Warden Lionel Sackville, 1st Duke of Dorset, made Walmer Castle built in 1540 his official residence (at one stage Walmer was a Cinque port limb of Sandwich). He modernised and extended the castle accommodation previously used by the humble captain of the castle. The poor old captain was booted out. The Duke also enclosed what had previously been the captain's garden, and developed it. Originally, the castle was one of Henry VIII's so-called 'device forts', a network of artillery strongholds built to protect England against possible French invasion.

=== Tenterden Incorporation into the Confederation (1449) ===
From 1300 – 1550 up to two hundred people lived at Smallhythe, the hamlet of Southern Tenterden was the thriving port with quays and a tidal dock surrounded by plentiful timber and iron supplies. It was one of the country's leading shipbuilding centres for much of the 15th and 16th centuries, constructing vessels for wars against the French. Repairs in the yard, and the breaking up of old ships were an important part of the work, as well as building small vessels for local merchants and fishing families. Another useful small port was situated at Reading Street. A ferry was needed to get across to Wittersham on the Isle of Oxney.

By the 14th century some grand ships built at Tenterden were helping the people of Rye to fulfil their duties for the Cinque Ports. Unfortunately, Rye suffered a series of catastrophic events: the Black Death, raids by marauding French forces, the changing course of the River Rother and the harbour no longer being navigable. From Rye's tragedies grew the continuing good fortunes of Tenterden from its wool trade.

In 1449, King Henry VI, pressed Tenterden to join the Confederation as a limb of Rye, thereby providing Rye with much needed revenue as well as access to the shipbuilding facilities at Smallhythe. In return for Tenterden's support of Rye, the King granted Tenterden a Royal Charter which effectively gave the town self-government. In return, the members together had to fulfil all the duties needed to maintain a fighting, merchant navy. Tenterden's official "Seal" showed a masted ship bearing the arms of the Cinque Ports and the Petlesdens.

=== Coronation Tradition ===
In 1066, Duke of Normandy, William the Conqueror defeated King Harold on Senlac Hill, seven miles from Hastings. At the end of the bloody, all-day battle, Harold was killed with an arrow shot in the eye. William was determined to be seen as the legitimate King of England. He set his sights on being crowned in the new Abbey Church that Edward the Confessor had built beside his Palace at Westminster.

For almost a thousand years, Westminster Abbey, with the Shrine of St Edward, King and Confessor, at its heart, has remained the place of coronation for our monarchs. William's Charter (written then in old French), coined the term "Cinque Ports" as at that time there were only five recognised ports. In return, William's requirement was for the annual provision of 57 ships for 15 days.

Cinque Port Mayors were first invited as Barons to coronations by King Richard I (known as the Lionheart) Coronation on 3 September 1189 as King of England. Richard's coronation ceremony was remarkable as it was the start of contemporary accounts being recorded. From then, the Cinque Port Barons, by tradition, carried the canopy over the monarch as he or she walked to and from the coronation. Afterwards, the Barons normally gave a share of the canopy to Christ Church at Canterbury. Another tradition was for the Barons to sit on the immediate right hand of the King or Queen at the banquet that followed the ceremony. That was the cause of much of the brawling among those who wanted to be regarded as "first at the banquet."

The last time the canopies were borne by the Cinque Port Barons, was at the coronation of George IV where they apparently asked the king for the state treasury to pay for the colourful robes they wore. That request was swiftly rejected.

William IV, who reigned for only seven years, did not invite them nor did his successor Queen Victoria in 1837 who was not amused. Despite losing their privileges and not attending the coronations of William IV and Victoria, the barons fought to keep their right to attend and in 1901 this was granted.

The Cinque Ports sent representatives to the coronation of Edward VII but no longer carried the canopy. Barons, including Tenterden's Mayor have been invited to all subsequent coronations since 1902, with the last coronation being for King Charles III on 6 May 2023.

=== Tenterden Cinque Port Barons ===
In 1902 the Tenterden Cinque Port Mayor was granted for the first time to attend the Coronation as Baron. This recognition went to Cllr Joseph Robert Dingle for King Edward VII's Coronation on 9 August 1902. Since then, there have been four other Coronation Barons. These were:

- Coronation Baron Edgar Howard for King George V held on 22 June 1911
- Coronation Baron Joseph Macrae Dingle for King George VI held on 12 May 1937
- Coronation Baron Stanley Jesse Day for Queen Elizabeth II held on 2 June 1953
- Coronation Baron John Seymour Crawford for King Charles III held on 6 May 2023

In the 21st century the title Baron of the Cinque Ports is reserved for Freemen elected by the Mayor, Jurats and Common Council of the Ports to attend a coronation and is solely honorary in nature.

== Tenterden's Freemen ==
Since 1960, Tenterden Town Council has bestowed on a number of its citizens the honorary title of Freeman (Freewoman). The Freedom itself carries no privilege and is purely an honour, reflecting the eminence of the person on whom it is conferred or in recognition of significant and valuable services rendered to the community by that person. The list of Freemen and Freewomen is:

- 1960 - Adams, E.A. (Mrs)
- 1960 - Chalk, L.
- 1988 - Roberts, H.V.
- 1991 - Cruttenden, R.J.
- 1993 - Goldsmith, N.D. (Mrs)
- 1997 - Champion, R.F.
- 2017 - Crawfurd, Raymond
- 2019 - Edwards, Henry H.O.
- 2021 - Greaves, Debbie (Mrs)
- 2022 - Kinlock, Colin

== Local government ==
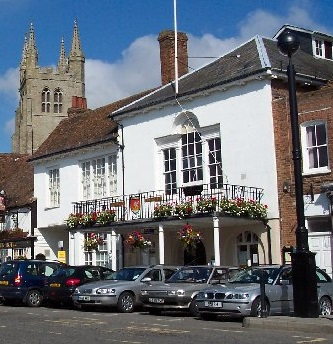
Tenterden Town Hall

In 1449 by means of the Cinque Ports Charter, Tenterden was legally separated from Kent and formally incorporated with Rye. To maintain the town's freedom, independent governors were appointed, i.e. a bailiff, jurats and heraldic emblem of the 13th century Cinque Ports Ship Communalty. The first bailiff (mayor) was Thomas, a local member of the substantial Petlesden family; Jurats were councillors with legal powers in the town court; the communalty included the privileged classes of merchants and freemen only.

The town also enjoyed many privileges such as administering justice and it erected a set of gallows for the execution of criminals. This gruesome but popular event took place at Gallows Green with a main viewing platform for the general public. The last execution was in 1785.

The Local Government Act 1894 set up rural district councils in England, and Tenterden was transitioned into a district. It became responsible for roadworks, general maintenance and housing for nine parishes. The mayor's extra duty was as an ex officio "justice of the peace" until 1968 when the role was abolished.

After 525 years of Tenterden's local powers which helped shape the town's and surrounding villages' destiny, on 1 April 1974, Local Government Act 1972 was implemented for England and Wales. The result was Tenterden District merging with the various Ashford districts and came under the control of Ashford Borough Council. At this time Tenterden Borough Council resolved to continue as a town council and continue to have a mayor who is also the chair of the council. Ashford Borough Council as the district authority, became responsible for waste collection and recycling, street cleaning, licensing, planning, housing, environmental issues, cemeteries, parking, tourism and tax collection.

Essential services such as education, highways, transportation, social services and public safety then become the responsibility of Kent County Council.

At midnight on 31 March 1974, both the Tenterden Borough Council and Tenterden Rural District Council had their last meetings before the new Ashford Borough Council took over administration for both areas. The ceremonial Badge of Office of Tenterden Rural District Council was handed over to the newly formed Ashford Borough Council for safe keeping and it has remained on display, along with other historical artefacts, in the Parlour of the Mayor of Ashford in the Civic Centre in Tannery Lane.

After 48 years, on 31 October 2022, "The Executive Leader of Ashford Borough Council" and "Worshipful the Mayor of Ashford" returned the Tenterden Rural District Council Chairman's Badge of Office back to Tenterden Town Council. The ribbon carries 9ct. gold bars, each engraved with past chairmen. The badge is made in 9ct. gold, hallmarked Birmingham 1959. On the front in the centre, are a collection of nine parish emblems. From the top in clockwise direction the emblems are:

- Saxon Font - Newenden
- Oak Tree – Rolvenden
- Bishops Mitre – Stone-in-Oxney
- May Pole – Wittersham
- Windmill - Woodchurch
- Viking Ship – Appledore (Viking raids)
- Maids - Biddenden
- Domesday Book – High Halden
- Saxon stockade – Kenardington

Today, Tenterden Town Council is still based in the 18th century Tenterden Town Hall (on the High Street) and has continued to be very active council providing numerous services. The Council consists of 16 councillors representing four wards across the parish. They are supported by a full time Town Clerk, Deputy Town Clerk with support staff and groundsmen. The council is responsible for community services through the raising an annual precept, which is collected via Ashford Borough Council through its council tax rates. The council's primary services are managing and provision for advertising banners (recreation ground & town hall balcony); benches; children's play areas; emergency planning; markets & fairs; millennium garden; parks and open spaces; pavilion; public conveniences (Tenterden and St Michaels); tennis courts; tourism; town planning; and war memorial. The Town Council is also responsible for the Town's Public Buildings such as 'The Pebbles' (which is home to the retail store 'White Stuff').

In the Town Hall is the Mayor's Parlour, which is licensed for the conduct of wedding, civil partnership, renewal of vows and baby naming ceremonies, and can accommodate up to forty-four guests. The Town Hall is also home to the Assembly Room, which can accommodate up to 150 people at a function and is also licensed for ceremonies (up to 140 guests). Both of these venues are available for hire.

The town council also has a statutory consultation role for a variety of matters related to planning applications and public rights of way. The council's planning committee meets on a monthly basis to consider scrutinise each application on material merits and advise Ashford Council of its decision with the reasons why. Ashford Borough Council, have the power to make the final decision according to the current planning laws passed by Parliament.

== Tourist attractions ==
- Chapel Down Winery
- Colonel Stephens Railway Museum
- Kent & East Sussex Railway (K&ESR) Museum
- Smallhythe Place
- Tenterden Family Fun Trail
- Tenterden Museum
- The High Street

== Local events ==
=== Christmas Market and Late Night Shopping ===
The Tenterden Christmas Market is an annual festive event held in November in the town centre of Tenterden, Kent. The market typically takes place over a weekend and features Christmas lights, food, local produce, craft stalls and seasonal entertainment. The event attracts residents and visitors to the High Street and surrounding areas, with local businesses and market traders taking part in the celebrations. The market developed from the town’s earlier Late Night Shopping tradition, when shops stayed open late in the run-up to Christmas and the High Street hosted festive activities and entertainment.

Tenterden hit the national headlines in August 2013, when it was proclaimed to be the first town in Britain to put up its Christmas lights. The lights had been erected in a tree 115 days before Christmas to publicise the Chamber of Commerce's efforts to raise the funds to replace the previous Christmas lights, which had gone missing in 2012.

=== Tenterden Folk Festival ===
Tenterden Folk Festival was a four-day event traditionally held on the first weekend in October each year in Tenterden, Kent, England. It began as a one-day event in 1993 and expanded to a four-day festival in 1998, running in that format until 2024. The festival featured a wide range of folk musicians performing at venues throughout the town, along with a craft market held in a large marquee on the recreation ground. From 2025 the event was replaced by a smaller one-day programme held on the first Saturday in October. The remaining programme, organised by the former festival committee, consists of a day of folk music at the Tenterden Club, while Morris dancers continue to gather independently for a day of dancing in Tenterden High Street.

=== The Spirit of Tenterden Festival ===
Spirit of Tenterden Festival is a three-day music, food and drink festival held annually on the first weekend in July on Tenterden Recreation Ground in Tenterden, Kent, England. The event was first held in 2019 and is organised by volunteers from Spirit of Tenterden CIC, a non-profit community organisation. The festival features live music performances across a range of genres, together with stalls offering food and drink from local producers and vendors. In addition to music and catering, the festival includes free family activities, children's entertainment and other community attractions. The event is supported by Tenterden Town Council, Ashford Borough Council, local businesses that sponsor the festival, and other community organisations.

== Leisure and recreation ==
=== Kiln Field Reserve and Wildlife ===
The nature reserve of 4.5 acres is a peaceful place to visit, with dipping platform to pond, trees, wild grasses and flowers. Located at Abbott Way, Kiln Field TN30 7BZ is located to the south east of Tenterden, to the south of Appledore Road B2080. It is only accessible by road through the housing estate leading to Abbott Way.

=== Millennium Garden ===
Owned and maintained by Tenterden Town Council. The entrance is behind White Stuff, via an alleyway to the left of the shop as you look at it from the High Street.

=== Smallhythe Cricket Club pitch, Smallhythe Road ===
The ground provides one cricket square. A small club based at the Pickhill pitch on Smallhythe Road. Well-used during cricket season.

=== St Michael's Recreation Ground ===
Owned and maintained by Tenterden Town Council. Recreation ground which provides informal recreation open space and includes a children's playground and a skate ramp.

=== Tenterden Cricket Club pitch, Smallhythe Road ===
The ground provides one cricket square. Has members of all ages and runs a number of junior and senior teams. The pitch is well-used during cricket season.

=== Tenterden Leisure Centre ===
Was opened by Diana, Princess of Wales in 1990 and run by Ashford Borough Council. Freedom Leisure took over the operation of Tenterden Leisure Centre on 1 May 2023 from the previous operator, Serco.

It has a wide range of activities aimed for the whole family, including a swimming pool with slides and wave machine - overseen by qualified lifeguards. The centre also has a gym and sports hall with instructors and organised classes.

=== Tenterden Recreation Ground ===
Owned and maintained by Tenterden Town Council. Public space which provides a full-sized football pitch, two hard-surface tennis courts and a children's playground. The privately run Tenterden Bowls Club is located within an enclosed section of the ground and provides one green.

== Education ==
=== Homewood School Tenterden (School site) ===
Homewood School was developed from the original Mansion House built in 1766 and today it is the main administrative building with a suite of management offices.

After some years as a military base in World War II, Homewood opened as a local secondary school when the owner, Lady Drury, made it available to Kent County Council following the post-war Government's decision that all children should have access to a secondary education.

The original school hall has now been redeveloped into The Sinden Theatre, a resource for all the local community, with a theatre terrace added in 2012 and a full refurbishment completed in 2021.

Today, Homewood is a large non-selective school of mixed 11–18 age group, with Academy status with 2000 students including 350 in the Sixth Form.

== Churches and chapels ==
There are two parish churches, as well as a number of other chapels and religious meeting spaces:

1. St Mildred's (Anglican) is in the main part of the town. The church dates from the 12th century, and was progressively enlarged until 1461, when the distinctive tower was constructed. It was one of the churches in the 1588 system of warning beacons.
2. St Michael and All Angels (Anglican). The suburb now called St Michael's was known as Boresisle until Victorian times, when a church dedicated to St Michael was built to serve this community. The church was consecrated in 1863, but construction of the steeple took a further 12 years.

Tenterden is blessed with a number of other churches, namely:

- St John the Baptist (Anglican).
- St Andrew's Catholic Church.
- Trinity Baptist Church.
- Zion Baptist Church.
- Jireh Chapel: Strict Baptist church.
- The Methodist Church.
- The Unitarian Chapel, originally called the Old Meeting House, was built c. 1695. A plaque on the wall records that Dr Benjamin Franklin worshipped here in 1783, where he was to hear Joseph Priestley preach.
- The Jehovah's Witness Kingdom Hall.

== Buildings of architectural significance ==
Heronden Hall is a Grade II listed Gothic-style mansion, designed by William Donthorne in 1846 for William Whelan.

=== Public houses ===
Its large and/or old pubs are generally owned by Kentish breweries and are:

- The Woolpack, next to the Town Hall,
- The White Lion, the High Street
- The Vine, the High Street
- The Tamarind Thai Bar, East Cross, Tenterden,
- The Print House, West Cross, Tenterden
- The Crown, Ashford Road in St Michaels
- The Fat Ox at the corner of Ashford Road and Ox Lane in St Michaels.

== Local organisations ==
=== Chamber of Commerce ===
The Tenterden and District Chamber of Commerce, a limited company (TDCC Ltd), promotes and supports businesses in Tenterden and the surrounding area. The Chamber is a thriving organisation which holds regular networking meetings for members. At Christmas the Chamber place small Christmas trees over the shop doorways and windows of many businesses on the High Street with financial support from Ashford Borough Council. TDCC Ltd is not an accredited Chamber of Commerce, it is a private company limited by guarantee without share capital.

=== Horticultural society ===
Its Horticultural Society organises lectures and shows throughout the year in a number of locations around the town.

=== Kent Army Cadet Force – Tenterden Detachment ===
A Detachment of the Army Cadet Force is based on Appledore Road in the Town and training takes place on Monday and Wednesday evenings from 1930 - 2130hrs. The Detachment provides a Mayor's Cadet to accompany the Mayor on Civic Duties and also provides a Standard Bearer for the Tenterden Royal British Legion Branch.

=== Lions Club of Tenterden ===
Tenterden Lions Club was formed in 1958; its members serve the community by giving time to local needs and raising money for local, national and international good causes. In spring time each year the club plants crocus bulbs along the greens, and every December the club arranges for Father Christmas to travel around Tenterden and some of the local villages providing enjoyment, as well as collecting money to support various good causes.

=== National Trust ===
The National Trust holds regular lectures on a diverse range of subjects at the Junior School on Recreation Ground Road.

=== Rotary Club of Tenterden ===
The Rotary Club is very active, bringing together local business people in aid of a number of charitable causes. The club runs a number of events during the year. It meets twice a month in the evening.

=== Royal British Legion ===
The Royal British Legion branch in Tenterden managed the annual poppy appeal, and is responsible, along with Tenterden Town Council, for the service at the War Memorial each year on Remembrance Sunday.

=== Tenterden and District History Society ===
The Society has monthly talks during the winter season, outings in the Summer, and its library is held at Tenterden Museum.

=== Tenterden Operatic and Dramatic Society ===
The local amateur dramatic society is TODS, which was founded (in its current form) in 1958, following the merger of a number of different companies. The society puts on three productions each year, either in the Assembly Room at the Town Hall or at the Sinden Theatre, and is often recognised in the Kent Drama Association Full-Length Play Festival.

=== Weald of Kent Lodge ===
The local chapter of the East Kent Freemasons is the Weald of Kent Lodge, which undertakes a great deal of charitable work.

=== Women's Institute ===
The Women's Institute has two branches based in the town: Tenterden Glebe, and St Michaels.

== Emergency services ==
=== Police ===
Kent Police opened Tenterden Police Station in Oaks Road (on the outskirts of the town centre) in 1956, before replacing it with a smaller Front Counter in a retail unit on the High Street at the beginning of the 21st century. This in turn was closed in 2012, with the town's police force based entirely at Ashford Police Station.

=== Fire and Rescue ===
Kent Fire and Rescue Service has an on-call fire engine based in St Michaels.

=== Medical care ===
The National Health Service with Kent County Council operate West View Integrated Care Centre (known locally as West View Hospital), providing adult social care and health care on the same site. The hospital which is near the town centre provides residential care for 30 dementia patients and a rehabilitation service for 30 adult patients who need help before they return home after illness or injury. The hospital also provides inpatient and outpatient physiotherapy. There is no Accident & Emergency department at the hospital. The nearest local Accident & Emergency department is at the William Harvey Hospital, in Willesborough near Ashford.

Ivy Court Surgery is an NHS GP practice offering a range of medical services and regular appointments. The Ivy Court Surgery building recently re-opened following a multimillion-pound new development providing a state of the art healthcare facility for Tenterden and the surrounding area. The old East Cross Clinic next door now houses the Coffee Shop at EC30, the Social Hub charity shop, a social prescribing centre, and a number of community wellbeing services with rooms to rent.

== Notable residents ==
- Benn Barham, professional British golfer.
- William Caxton, thought to be the first English person to work as a printer and the first to introduce a printing press into England, is reputed to have been born in the town, with evidence also indicating that he was born in Hadlow.
- Edith Craig (daughter of Ellen Terry), actress, theatre director, producer, costume designer and early pioneer of women's suffrage, lived at Smallhythe Place.
- Nicki French, international singer/songwriter.
- David Frost, media personality and daytime TV game show host, was born at Kench Hill in Tenterden.
- Kevin Godley (of 10cc and Godley & Creme) was the owner of Heronden Hall and Heronden Gatehouse.
- Agnes Grebill of Tenterden (died 1511), Lollard martyr
- Thomas Haffenden One of the first yeoman of the guard 1460-1525
- Thomas Hinckley, (c. 1618–1706), Governor Plymouth Colonies 1680–1692.
- Marjorie Horatia Johnson, the great-great-granddaughter of Admiral Nelson, spent the last years of her life at Kench Hill, dying there in 1974.
- Gary Hume, artist, Royal Academician and Turner Prize nominee.
- Roderick Kedward, historian and specialist on Vichy France and the Resistance.
- Sholto Marcon, Olympic gold medallist in field hockey, was Vicar of Tenterden.
- John Parker (died 1564) who became a leading statesman and judge in Ireland, began life as a cloth-maker in Tenterden.
- Peter Richardson, the Worcestershire, Kent and England cricketer, lived in the town in later life.
- Sir Donald Sinden, the actor, lived in the area until his death in 2014, and the local theatre is named after him
- Arthur Symons, poet and literary critic, died in Tenterden in 1945, having lived in the town since around 1920.
- Dame Ellen Terry, the actress, lived for many years at nearby Smallhythe Place (which is now National Trust).
- Samuel J. Tilden, who lost the US presidency by one vote in 1876, is descended from the Tilden family of Tenterden.

== Sports ==
- Tenterden Town Football Club, established in 1889, is based at the Sports Pavilion on the southern half of the recreation ground, where it has played since formation. After many seasons of varied fortunes, for the 2008/09 season it had two teams: the 1st XI competed in the Kent County League, and the Reserve XI competed in the Ashford & District Football League, both on a Saturday afternoon. Tenterden's recreation ground hosts the annual Weald of Kent Charity Cup Final, which Tenterden Town Football Club itself has contested on a number of occasions, most recently during the 2000/01 season, when it lost 3–1 to Tyler Hill.
- Tenterden Tigers Junior Football Club, established in 1996.
- Tenterden Cricket Club, based on Smallhythe Road.
- The Tour de France raced through the town in July 2007, with an intermediate sprint taking place in Tenterden.
- Homewood Badminton Club was formed over 30 years ago for intermediate and advanced players. They play every Tuesday at the Tenterden Leisure Centre and participate in local leagues.
- Tenterden Golf Club is by the road Chalk Hill.
- 1066 Archery Club is based on the outskirts of Tenterden at the Pickhill Business Centre.
- Tenterden Netball Club was established over 10 years ago for all players to join. 2 teams play in competitive leagues and the club is growing all the time. They welcome new members to training and can be found on a Thursday evening at homewood school courts.

== Local media ==
Tenterden has one local commercial radio station, KMFM Ashford, which serves the entire borough of Ashford. There is also one local community radio station Radio Ashford. The town is also served by county wide stations BBC Radio Kent, Heart South and Gold. It lies within the BBC South East and ITV Meridian regions.

The local newspaper is the Kentish Express, published by the KM Group.

== Twinning ==
Tenterden is twinned with:

- Avallon, Yonne, France

== Arms ==
Coat of arms of Tenterden

Notes
Recorded in 1619.
Escutcheon
Gules in base waves of the sea Proper and thereon a ship of three masts Or the sail on the foremast furled the mainsail per pale Gules and Azure thereon three demi lions passant guardant Or conjoined to as many hulks of ships also Argent the mizzen charged with the arms Argent on a bend Sable between four lions' heads erased Gules three mullets of six points Or.
