= Aylesford Stream =

Stream in Kent, England

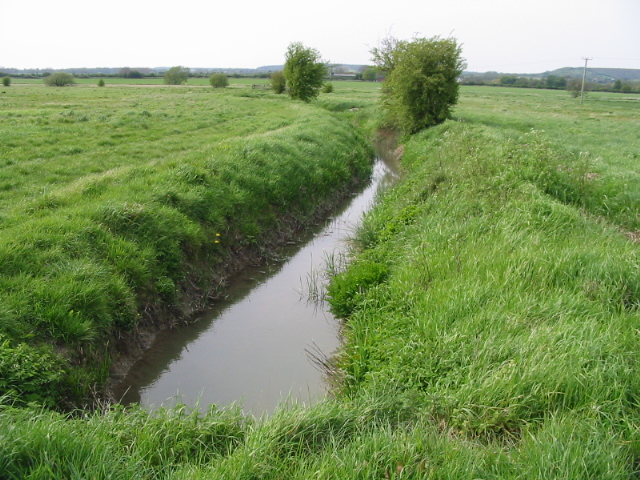
- Aylesford Stream

Physical characteristics
- Source
  - location: between Wye with Hinxhill and West Brabourne
- Mouth
  - location: Great Stour at Ashford, Kent, England, TQ 015 428
  - coordinates: 51°08′05″N 0°52′24″E
- Length: 5.4 km (3.4 mi)

The Aylesford Stream is a 5.4 kilometre long tributary of the East Stour, itself a tributary of the Great Stour in Kent. The stream's source is north of the M20, between Wye with Hinxhill and West Brabourne, and runs through Willesborough and then between Newtown and South Willesborough to join the East Stour just west of Ashford Designer Outlet.

The area along the stream forms part of a Local Nature Reserve, the Ashford Green Corridor, with pollarded willows adjacent to Bentley Road in Willesborough. Part of the area is designated as the South Willesborough Dykes, a Site of Nature Conservation Interest (SNCI). The dykes continue on the east side of the East Stour and amongst the residential areas.

When High Speed 1 was built through Ashford, the stream was diverted to run alongside the railway line.
