= Stour Valley Walk =

Recreational walking route in England

Coordinates: 51°12′42″N 0°58′31″E

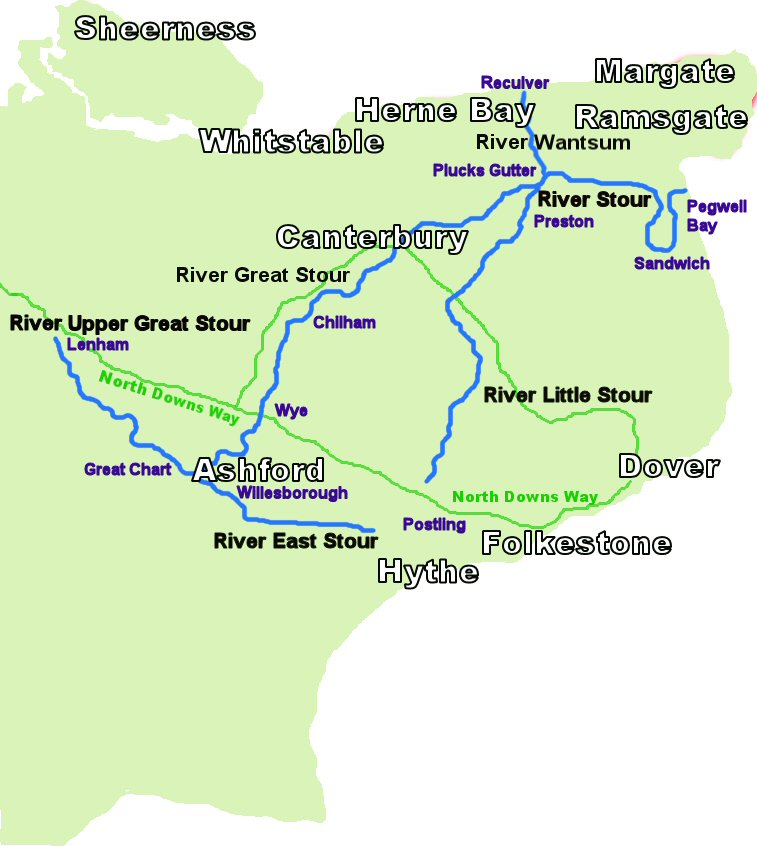
The River Routes

The Stour Valley Walk is a recreational walking route that follows the River Stour, through the Low Weald and Kent Downs, from its source at Lenham to its estuary at Pegwell Bay.

Stour Valley Signs

The walk passes through some of Kent's finest landscapes, most important nature sites and most historic, unspoilt villages. The walk is signed with the logo of a heron, a bird occasionally seen in the area.

The 58 miles (93 km) route is of interest for its landscape and history, and for its archaeological, historical and architectural features. Part of the Pilgrims' Way followed the river valley from Wye to Canterbury after the North Downs.

The walk passes through a varied landscape of downland, woodland, orchards, hop gardens and farmland; lakes, dykes and marshland; unspoilt villages and hamlets, and historic towns.

It is possible to reach the walk from Maidstone via the 12 kilometre long Len Valley Walk.

== The route ==
- a) Lenham to Little Chart 6 1/4 miles (10.1 km)
- b) Little Chart to Ashford 8 1/4 miles (13.3 km)
- c) Ashford to Wye 5 1/2 miles (8.9 km)
- d) Wye to Godmersham 5 miles (8.0 km)
- e) Godmersham to Chilham 3 1/4 miles (5.2 km)
- f) Chilham to Chartham 3 1/2 miles (5.6 km)
- g) Chartham to Canterbury 4 miles (6.4 km)
- h) Canterbury to Sturry 2 1/2 miles (4.0 km)
- i) Sturry to Upstreet 6 miles (9.7 km)
- j) Upstreet to East Stourmouth 3 miles (4.8 km)
- k) East Stourmouth to Sandwich 7 1/2 miles (12.1 km)
- l) Sandwich to Pegwell Bay 3 1/2 miles (5.6 km)

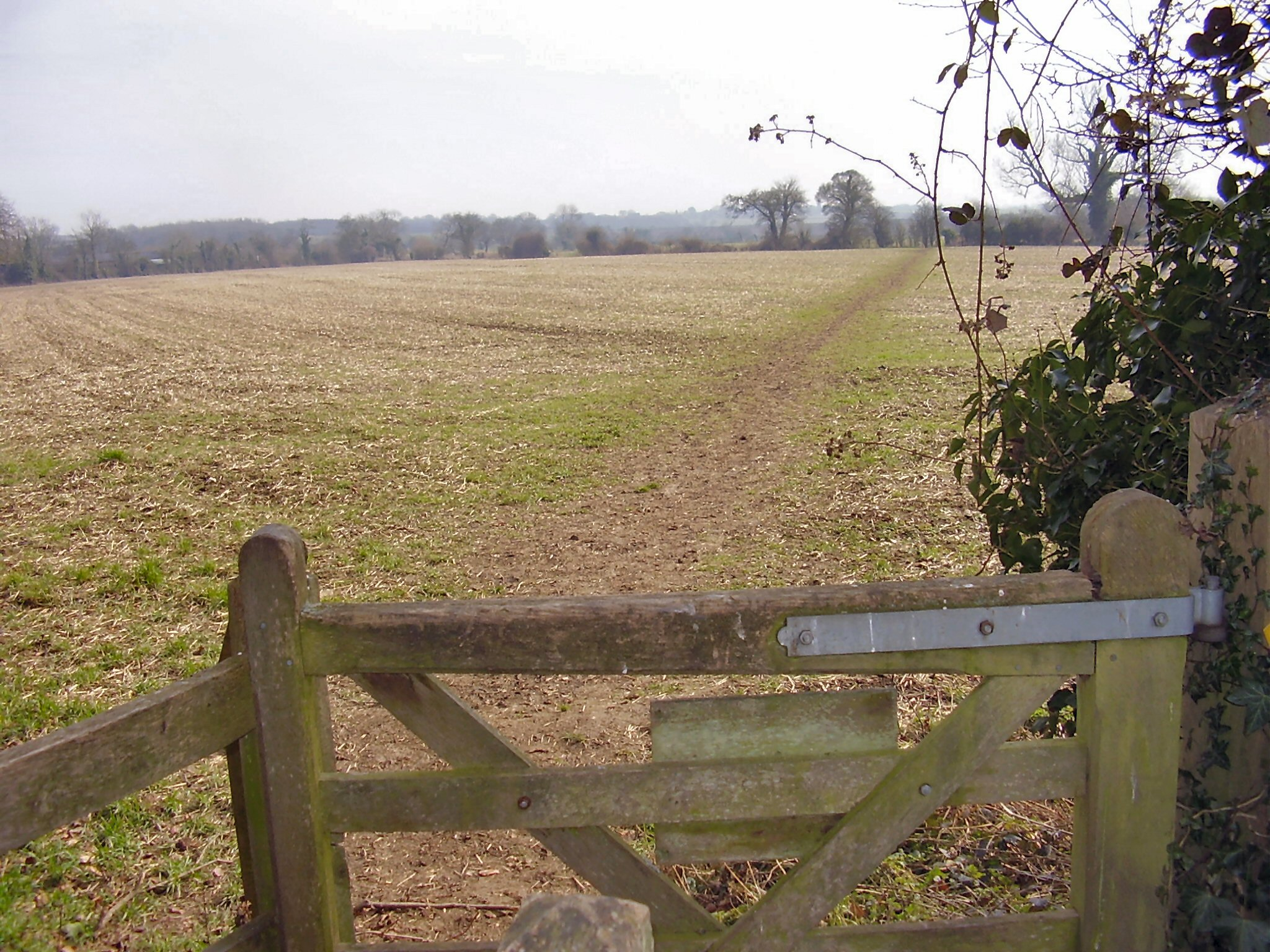
From Lenham across the countryside

=== Lenham to Little chart ===
6 1/4 miles (10.1 km) – grid reference TQ897522 to grid reference TQ950460

Walking south-east from Lenham, across the church yard and then immediately into the countryside, through agricultural fields, gaining a first sighting of a stream running to become part of the River. The route then traverses a pedestrian crossing of the railway, to Lenham Heath and then over High Speed 1 and the Motorway (M20) to Little Chart where the path joins the Greensand Way.

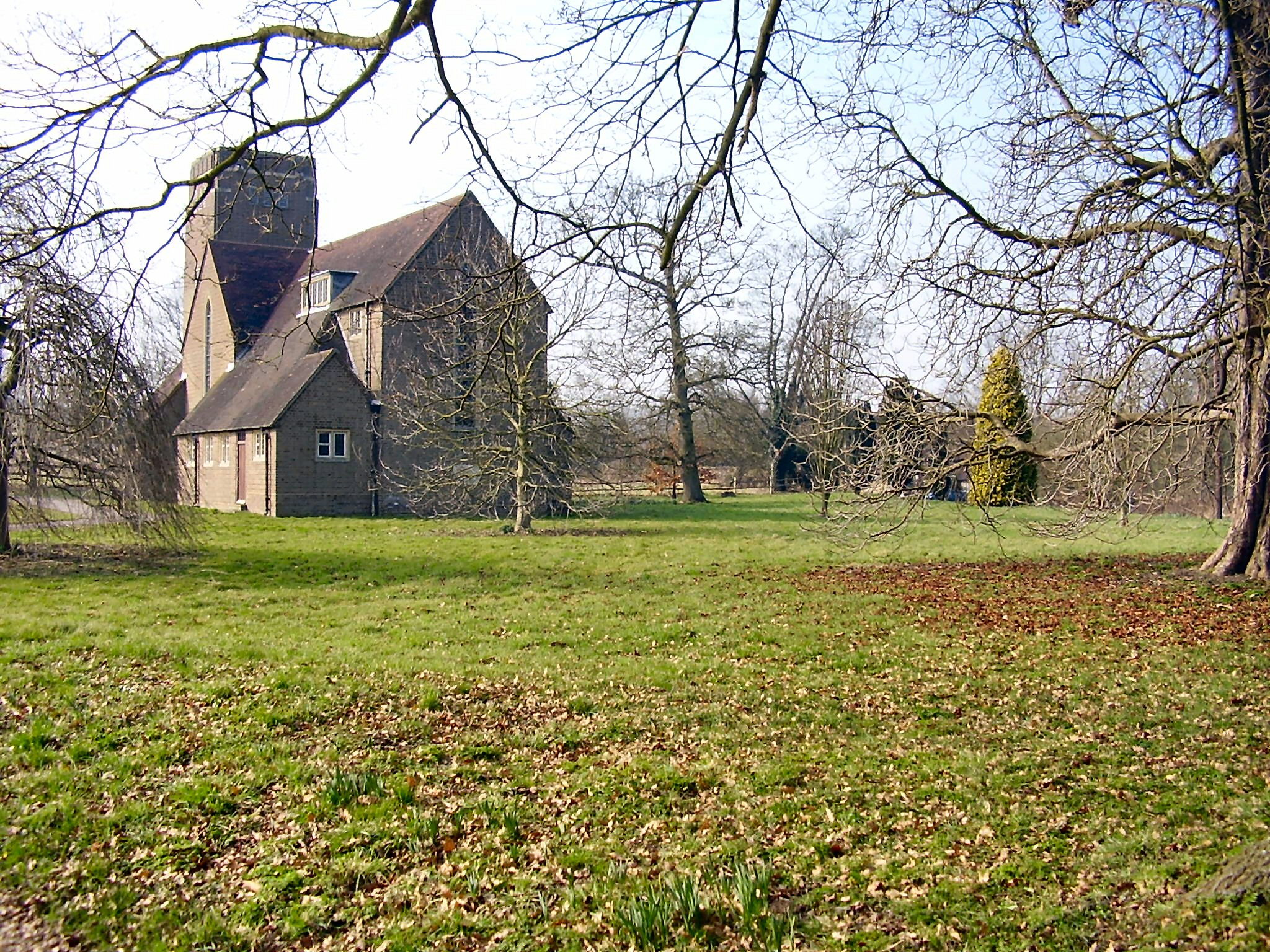
Little Chart Church

=== Little Chart to Ashford ===
8 1/4 miles (13.3 km) – grid reference TQ950460 to grid reference TR005425

The Stour Valley Walk separates from the Greensand Way at Hothfield Common and merges again at Godinton, heading south to Great Chart, where the Greensand Way continues south, to Kingsnorth and Hamstreet. Our walk follows the now larger upper reaches of the Great Stour eastwards to Singleton Lake and along the Ashford Green Corridor (Local Nature Reserve) into Ashford's centre.

The Ashford Green Corridor web site has a very useful map showing Singleton Lake and other green areas within Ashford and the route of this part of the walk. In this section of the walk common kingfishers, grass snakes, damselflies and possibly water voles can be seen.

=== Ashford to Wye ===
5 1/2 miles (8.9 km) – grid reference TR005425 to grid reference TR053467

The confluence of the East Stour and the Great Stour is at the old mill at the bottom of East Hill in Ashford, and the walk continues from here, heading east to Willesborough Lees and then north to Wye where the Stour Valley Walk crosses the North Downs Way's southerly section.

=== Wye to Chilham ===
8 1/4 miles (13.3 km) – grid reference TR053467 to grid reference TR069537

There is a slight ascent as the route leaves Wye, rising from 35 m to 150 m, and some of the paths are narrow containing rabbit holes.

In this stage the Stour Valley Walk follows the path of the Great Stour river as it meanders through the countryside of East Kent. One of the most beautiful sections of this walk can be found between the villages of Wye and Chilham, passing through a rolling landscape with panoramic views. There are regular bus and train links to both Canterbury and Ashford from the start and finish points of this walk.

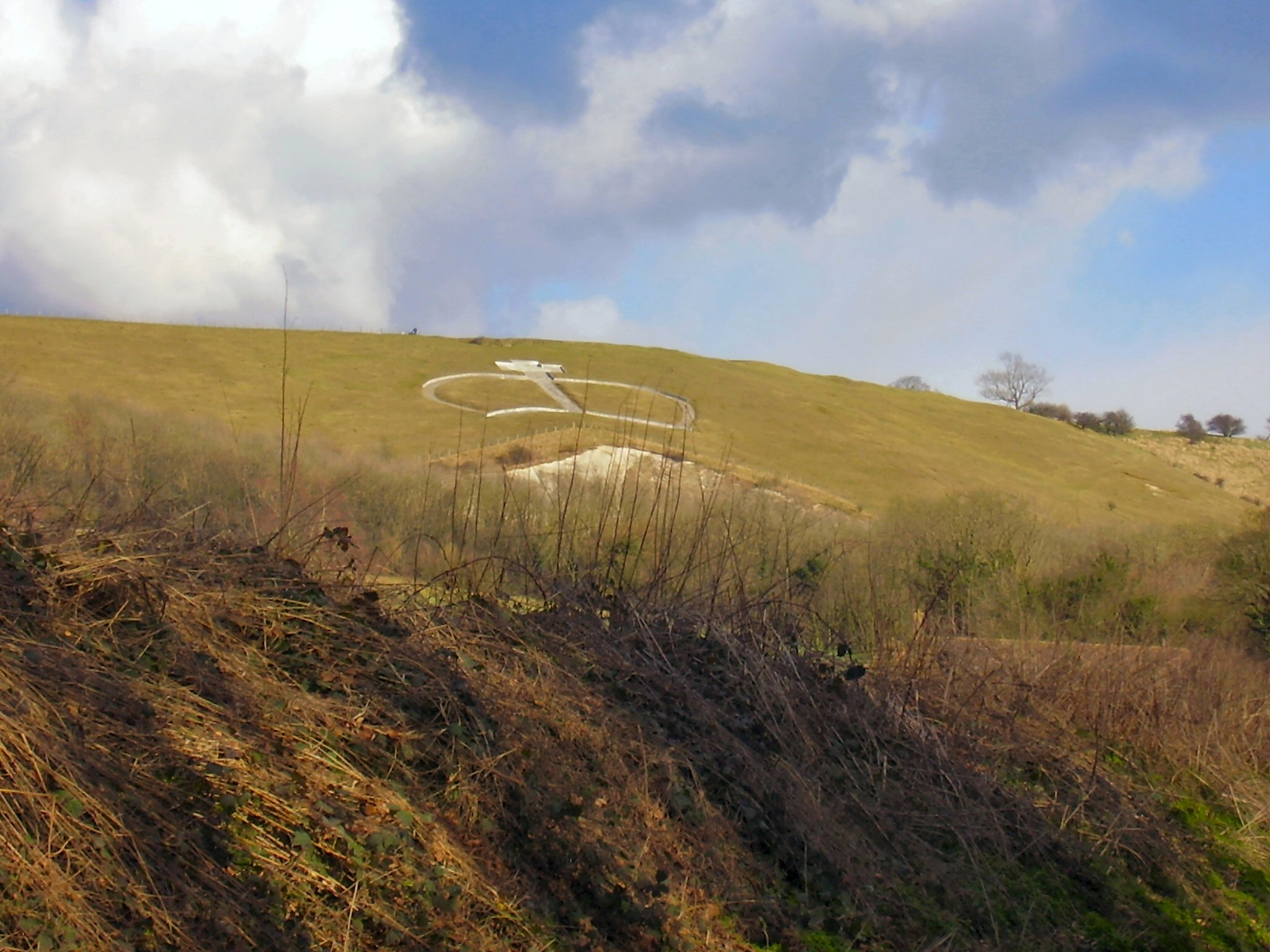
The Wye Crown

From the station at Wye walk up into the village crossing the river for the first time, and turn left into Church Street. From the church follow the route signs for the North Downs Way and Stour Valley Walk, pass through the college buildings crossing a road and then out into open farmland. Here the Stour Valley Walk and the North Downs Way separate, as the North Downs Way heads east, above the Wye Crown to Dover. Follow the path cutting diagonally left across the field towards woodland.

Once through the woodland the path dips into the valley offering views of the surrounding countryside and then continues through coppiced woodland to open meadow land and the village of Crundale. The path follows an unmade road branching off to the left across farmland leading into dense woodland, where it is lined with yew trees. The walk follows several sections of woodland, and as the route approaches Chilham, there are views of the castle. The path then branches to the left over a stile, this link path then takes walkers back down to the river to the Chilham mill.

For Chilham village square follow the road from the mill to the A28. The main square boasts timber framed houses, a 13th century church and the impressive castle gateway.

For the railway station turn right at the main road and continue for approximately 150 metres then turn left – the station should be clearly signed.

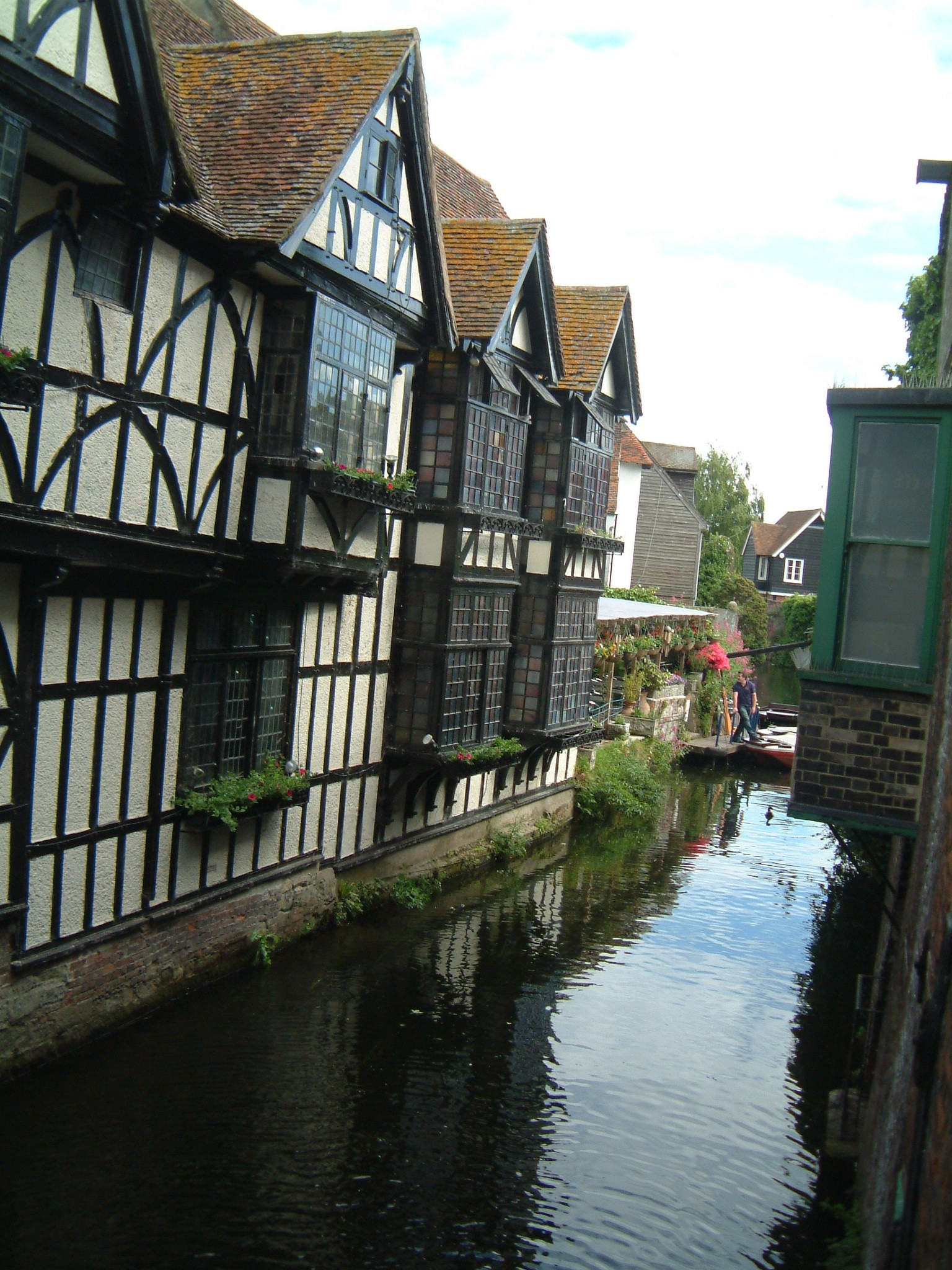
The River in Canterbury city centre

=== Chilham to Canterbury ===
7 1/2 miles (12.1 km) – grid reference TR069537 to grid reference TR147577

Leaving Chilham village, head east across the river to pick up the main Stour Valley Walk, passing the Neolithic long barrow, Julliberrie's Grave and then follow the route north-east to Shalmsford Street, and on towards Thanington Without and Canterbury.

=== Canterbury to Upstreet ===
8 1/2 miles (13.7 km) – grid reference TR147577 to grid reference TR224629

=== Upstreet to Sandwich ===
10 1/2 miles (16.9 km) – grid reference TR224629 to grid reference TR328583 At Upstreet the path joins the Saxon Shore Way heading towards Sandwich.

=== Sandwich to Pegwell Bay ===
3 1/2 miles (5.6 km) – grid reference TR328583 to grid reference TR345623

== See also ==
- Long-distance footpaths in the UK
