= Ashford Green Corridor =

Green space in Ashford, England

Coordinates: 51°9′10″N 0°52′50″E

Ashford Green Corridor is a green space that runs through the town of Ashford in Kent, England. The Green Corridor is made up of parks, recreation grounds and other green spaces alongside the rivers that flow through Ashford. It is a Local Nature Reserve.

The town has been growing steadily since the early 19th century. As the town has expanded, land close to the rivers has not usually been built on, due to the risk of flooding because the Ashford Borough Council has protected it as green space.

== Flood protection ==
Because the Green Corridor areas are right next to Ashford's rivers, many of them hold floodwater, protecting homes and businesses. This is particularly important now because floods seem to be occurring more frequently.

== Wildlife ==
The Green Corridor brings wildlife to the town. Ashford's rivers are surprisingly natural considering their urban surroundings, and are home for many wild plants and animals. Common kingfishers, grass snakes, damselflies and possibly water voles can all be seen. Ponds like the one at Bowen's Field attract amphibians. Singleton Lake is a habitat for wetland birds and Buxford Meadow is a wet grassland with an enormous range of plants, insects and other species. It is because these habitats are so close to where people live that the Green Corridor has been designated as a Local Nature Reserve.

== Heritage ==
From the manors of Singleton and Buxford in the west, to Boys Hall Moat (a scheduled ancient monument) in the east, the Green Corridor is rich in heritage. Victoria Park, with its fountain and commemorative trees, the intriguingly named 'Watercress Fields', and Martyr's Field with its macabre past - all have stories to tell. Many areas were farmed until relatively recently and are living links to Ashford's past as an agricultural market town.

== The Green Corridor ==
The Ashford Green Corridor web site map shows the various parts of Ashford that make up the corridor.

=== Aylesford Green ===
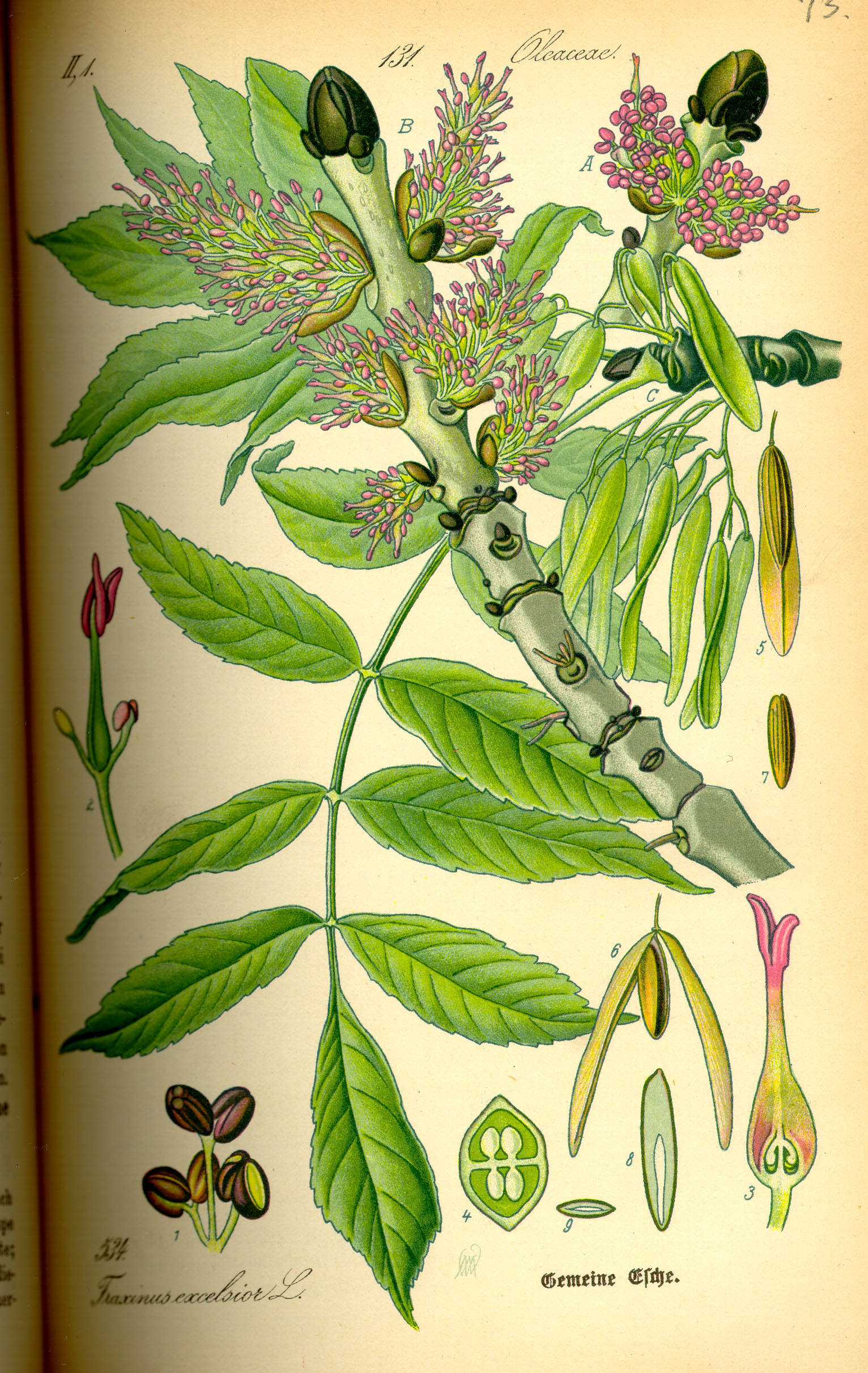
European ash

Aylesford Green is an attractive area for informal recreation. The site has a variety of habitats including a wide margin of long vegetation by the Aylesford Stream that forms an important habitat for invertebrates. A small wooded area dominated by ash and alder borders Boys Hall Road. Wood mice have been recorded in this area and long-tailed tits are often seen perching in ash trees, particularly in winter. Pollarded willows by the Aylesford Stream provide an attractive area adjacent to Bentley Road. The site is linked to South Willesborough by a pedestrian bridge over High Speed 1 onto Newtown Road. Banded demoiselle and common blue damselfly have been recorded at the site.

=== Bowen's Field ===
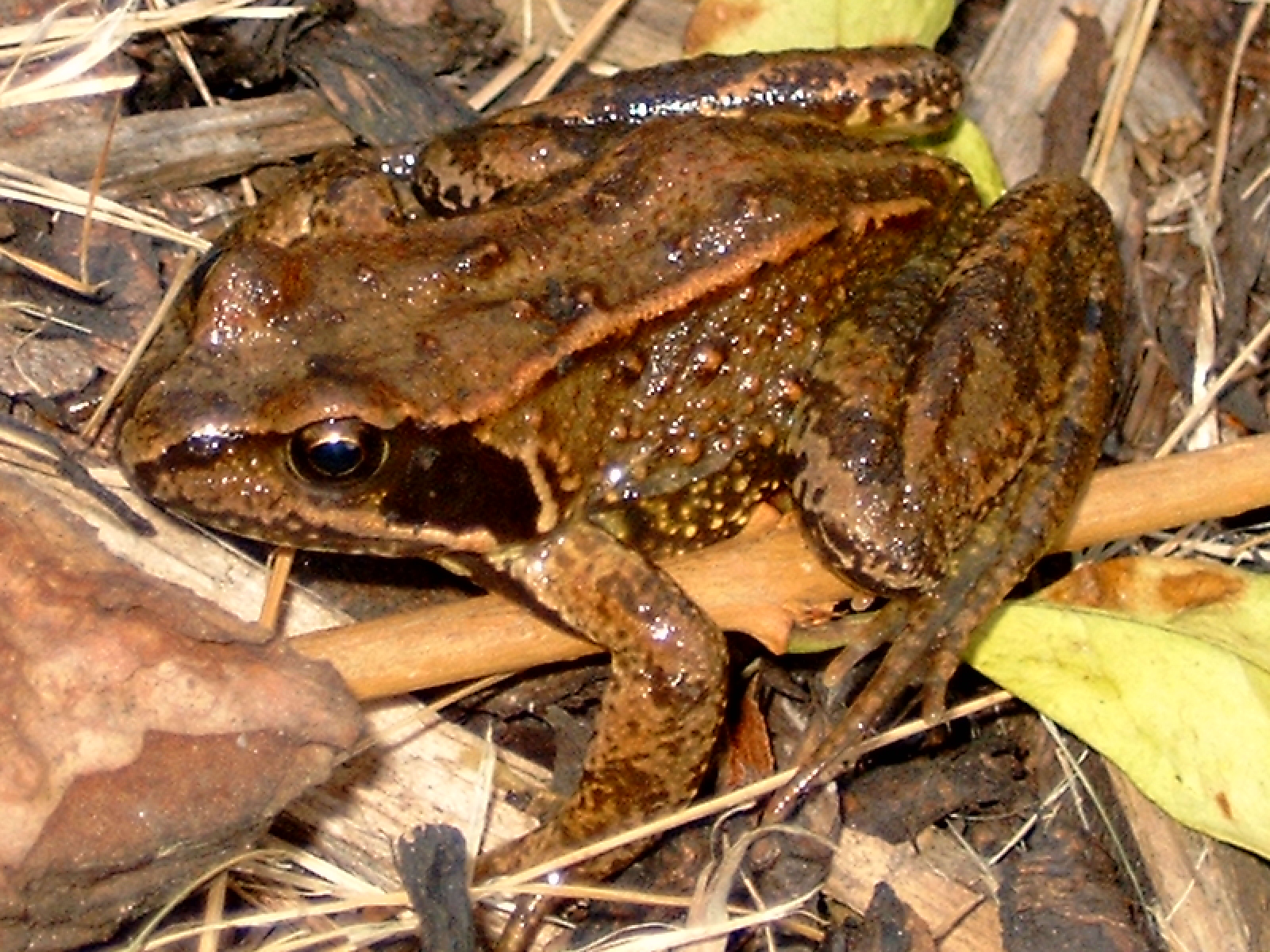
The common frog

Bowen's Field is an informal recreation area, adjacent to the Great Stour. It is thought that this site was one of the last areas to be farmed in Ashford, it belonged to a local livestock trader called Mr Sidney Herbert Bowen, died 1971 and he is commemorated on a plaque at the entrance to the site from Victoria Park. This area was also adjacent to the town’s lido (outdoor swimming pool) which was built in 1867 and was at the time the largest in Britain. The site is now a flood storage area consisting of damp grassland, with a large pond where banded demoiselle, blue-tailed damselfly, azure damselfly, smooth newt, and common frog have been recorded.

=== Boys Hall ===
The site has good views of the North Downs in one direction and the town of Ashford in the other as well as Boys Hall, the house that gives the site its name. The site is characterised by oak and hazel as well as other mature tree species. A variety of dragonflies and damselflies have been seen at the site including emperor dragonfly, ruddy darter and blue-tailed damselfly. There is a pedestrian bridge over High Speed 1, linking this site with Boys Hall Moat. Adjacent to the bridge is an area of reedbed. On the Church Road side of Boys Hall, the site is more formal with mature trees such as turkey oak, providing a pleasant buffer zone between housing and the Southern Orbital road.

=== Boys Hall Moat ===
A Scheduled Ancient Monument dating from the 13th century. The area consists of a moated island that would have been the site of a dwelling in the past. Mature trees are present on the island that form roost sites for common bird species. The topography of the ground is complex, suggesting extensive earthworks have taken place in the past. The site essentially has an open character although there are areas of scrub.

=== Buxford Meadow ===
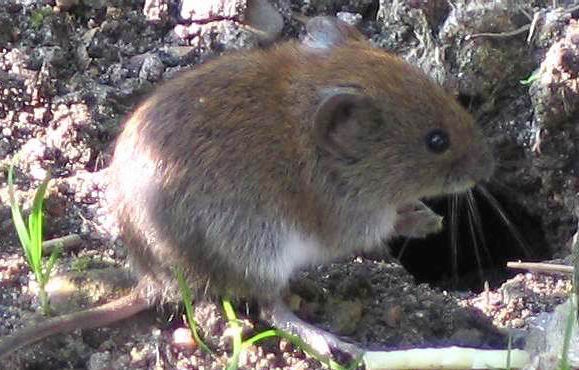
The bank vole

Buxford Meadow is adjacent to the Great Stour and a millstream for Buxford Mill flows through it. The site consists of a wet meadow with white willow, crack willow and goat willow. In the middle of the meadow there is a pond whose margins consist predominantly of reedmace, the pond supports a diverse array of wildlife including common frogs, toads and smooth newts. Twelve species of dragonfly have been recorded at the site (25% of all UK species) and 54 moth species including the nationally notable Webb's wainscot, whose caterpillars develop in reedmace. The site is also ideal for small mammals - field vole and pygmy shrew have been recorded in the grassland and woodmouse and bank vole in the woodland. There is an area of wet woodland incorporating ash, alder, English oak and grey willow trees. The wet glades support large areas of water mint. The Stour Valley Walk passes through the wood leading to Great Chart and beyond.

=== Bybrook Cemetery ===
Contains many mature trees and a plantation of memorial trees called 'Cherry Garden Wood'.

=== Church Road Playing Field ===
Church Road playing field is a very self-contained site on the borders of Willesborough and Sevington. It is a peaceful park with a play area.

=== Civic Centre North Park ===
The confluence of the East Stour and Great Stour is at Pledge’s Mill which stands at the northern end of the park. It is thought that there has been a mill on this part of the river from 1086 (a mill was recorded on this site at the time of the Domesday Book). The main features of the park are the pollarded willows, an important habitat for a range of invertebrate species.

=== Civic Centre South Park ===
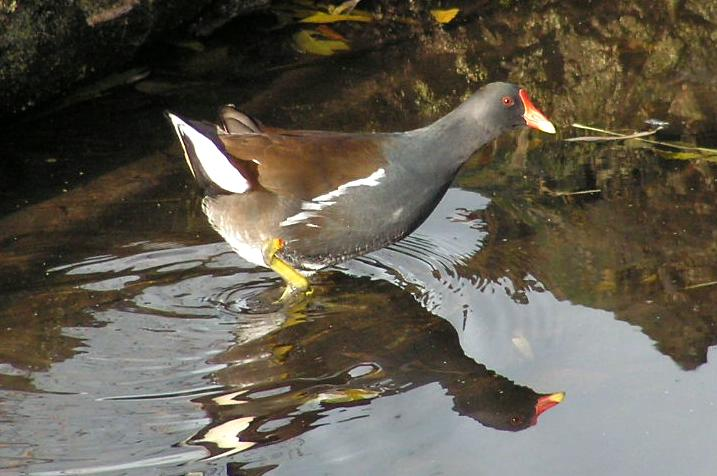
The common moorhen

The Local Nature Reserve includes the riverside area at Civic Centre Park South. Although this is a busy thoroughfare and close to the skate park, a survey has shown that Water Voles are present in this part of the East Stour. The bridge over the river is a good viewpoint where moorhens and grey wagtails can be spotted.

=== Gashouse Fields ===
This area, positioned between South Willesborough and Newtown, includes some good riverside habitats and an area of woodland called 'The Spinney', with public access.

=== Godinton ===
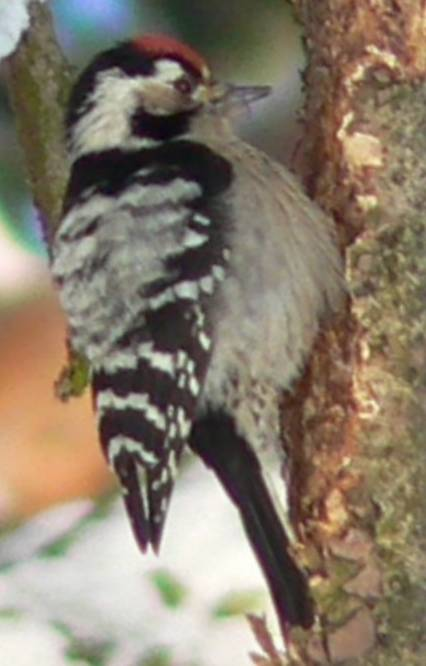
The lesser spotted woodpecker

On the outskirts of Ashford, this historic parkland can be enjoyed by following the Greensand Way or the Stour Valley Walk. Godinton House also has its own trail around its fabulous grounds. The parkland contains a huge variety of unspoilt habitats all supporting a diversity of wildlife. It is because of this that Godinton Park has been designated an SNCI.

The old parkland trees and pockets of woodland throughout the grounds provide good habitat for nesting birds such as the lesser spotted woodpecker. The river is home to the white clawed crayfish and kingfishers are known to fly along this stretch of water.

=== Great Chart ===
Great Chart is a village on the western outskirts of Ashford. Great Chart north is a small parcel of land adjacent to the Ashford Rifle Club and the East Stour.

=== Great Chart Wood ===
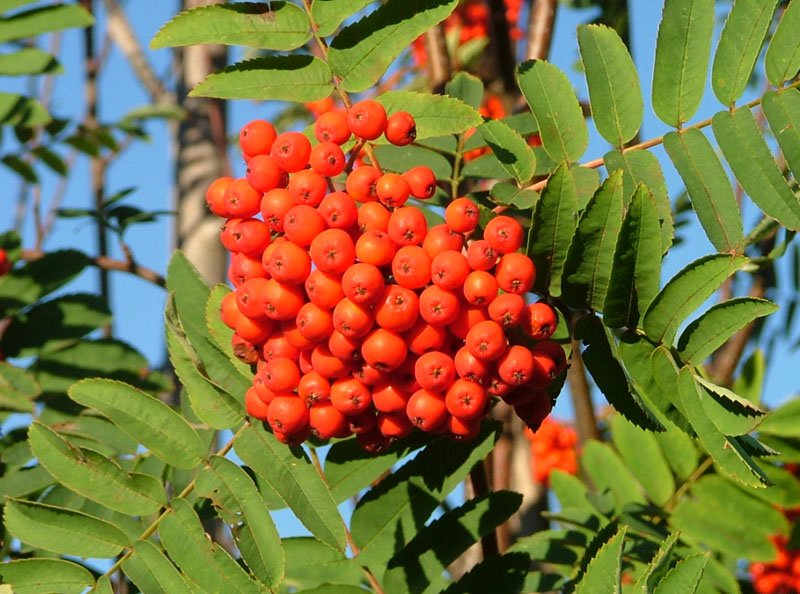
Rowanberries

This is a new 23,000 square metre woodland, planted and managed by the Woodland Trust. The land at Great Chart was purchased in 2000 as one of the Woodland Trust's "Woods on your Doorstep project", to create a new community woodland close to Ashford.

The wood was planted using native species, to provide a valuable area for public recreation and wildlife. The land was given to The Woodland Trust by Ashford Borough Council and the woodland was planted in November 2000 with help from local people. Species of trees and shrubs planted included oak, ash, rowan and hornbeam.

Prior to planting, an archaeological survey revealed a number of earthworks of historical interest, which have been left as found and incorporated into the ride network as unplanted land .

=== Little Burton ===
There is access here alongside the river and into an open space next to the Little Burton housing estate. River habitats are good and there are many mature trees, including the species of willow used for making cricket bats, which is sometimes called the cricket bat willow.

Woodland has been planted near the estate, and a large pond created. There is also an interesting wetland area near the railway. Access is good, via a network of paths.

As recently as 1992, this land was farmed - there was a large orchard where the houses now stand.

=== Newtown Green ===
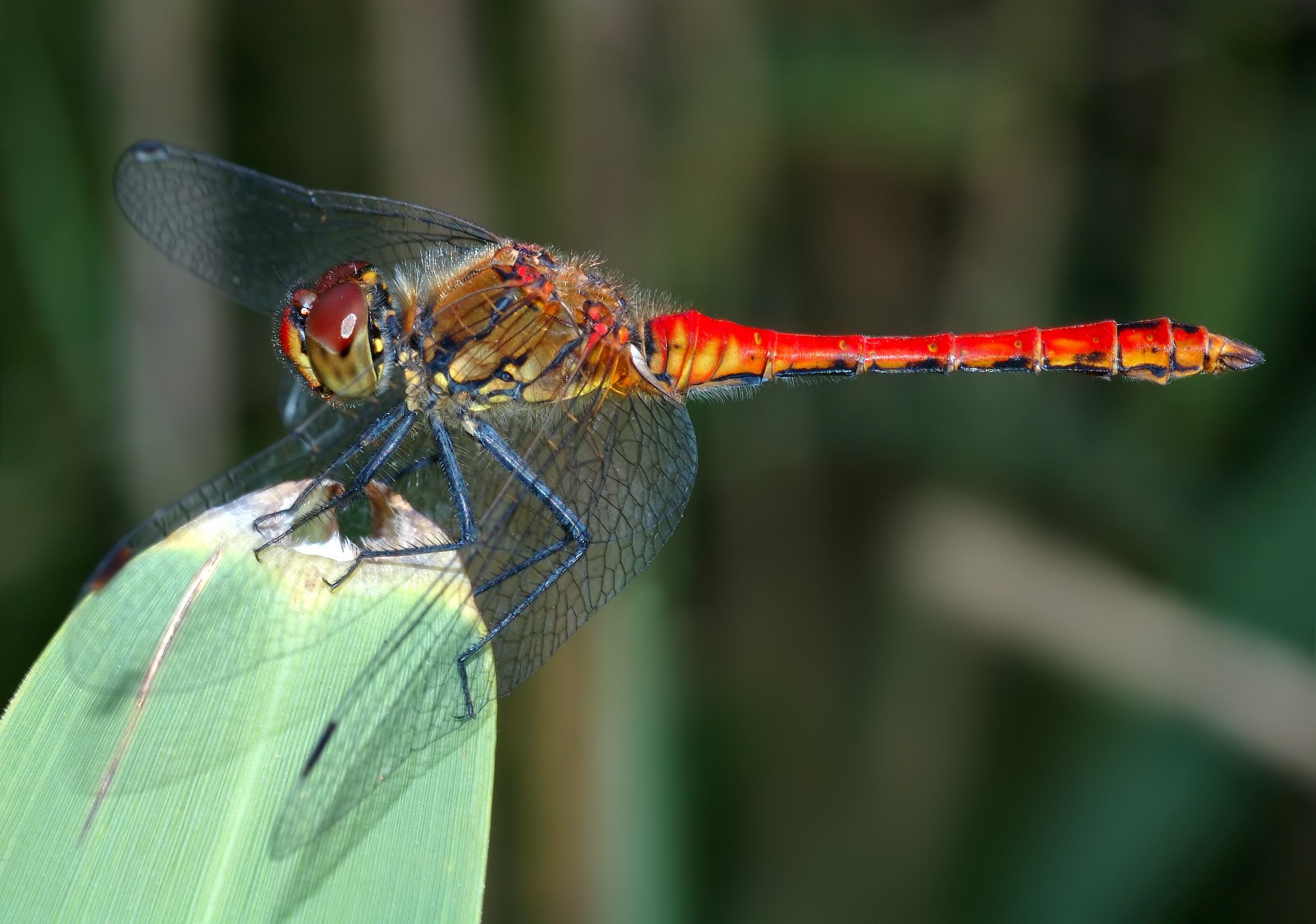
The ruddy darter

Newtown Green consists of open areas of green space for informal recreation and organised sports. Mature trees form the perimeter of the site and the Aylesford Stream runs along the edge. Ruddy darter, banded demoiselle, blue-tailed damselfly and common blue damselfly have been recorded at the site.

=== Queen Mother's Park ===
It is a useful link for both pedestrians and cyclists from Bybrook and Kennington to the town centre and also beyond to the rest of the Green Corridor. The banks of the Great Stour here have wide margins of riverside vegetation and in places blocks of mature native trees. There is a small woodland garden at the northern end, where European green woodpeckers can be heard. In the past this land was probably sheep pasture - an 1876 Ordnance Survey map shows sheepfolds on the site.

A darker side to the site’s history is illustrated at its entrance off the Hythe Road where a plaque commemorates the martyrs of the 16th century that were persecuted for their religious beliefs.

=== South Willesborough Dykes ===
On the west bank of the East Stour river is an area of sheep fields drained by dykes, the area is designated as the South Willesborough Dykes Site of Nature Conservation Interest (SNCI).

=== Sevington ===
The community of Sevington was cut off from its church by the building of the Southern Orbital road. Despite this, the church and Court Lodge Farm present quite a rural scene, and the fields nearby make for pleasant walking on public footpaths, with some wildlife interest in the form of ditches and hedgerows. Heading east, the charming village of Mersham is only a mile away.

=== Singleton Lake ===
Singleton Lake is a man–made fishing lake, it has areas of willow and alder around its perimeter as well as small areas of reedbed. At night Daubenton's bat can be seen flying over the water. There are 2 sculptures by Antony Gormley (creator of the Angel of the North sculpture) and a stretch of boardwalk. Singleton Lake supports a variety of common bird species, as well as birds that are unlikely to be seen elsewhere in the Green Corridor including great crested grebe and reed warbler. Two damselfly species have been recorded at the site, common blue damselfly and blue-tailed damselfly. Singleton Lake has parking, picnic areas and good links to the rest of the Green Corridor and wider countryside in the Great Chart area.

=== Swanton ===
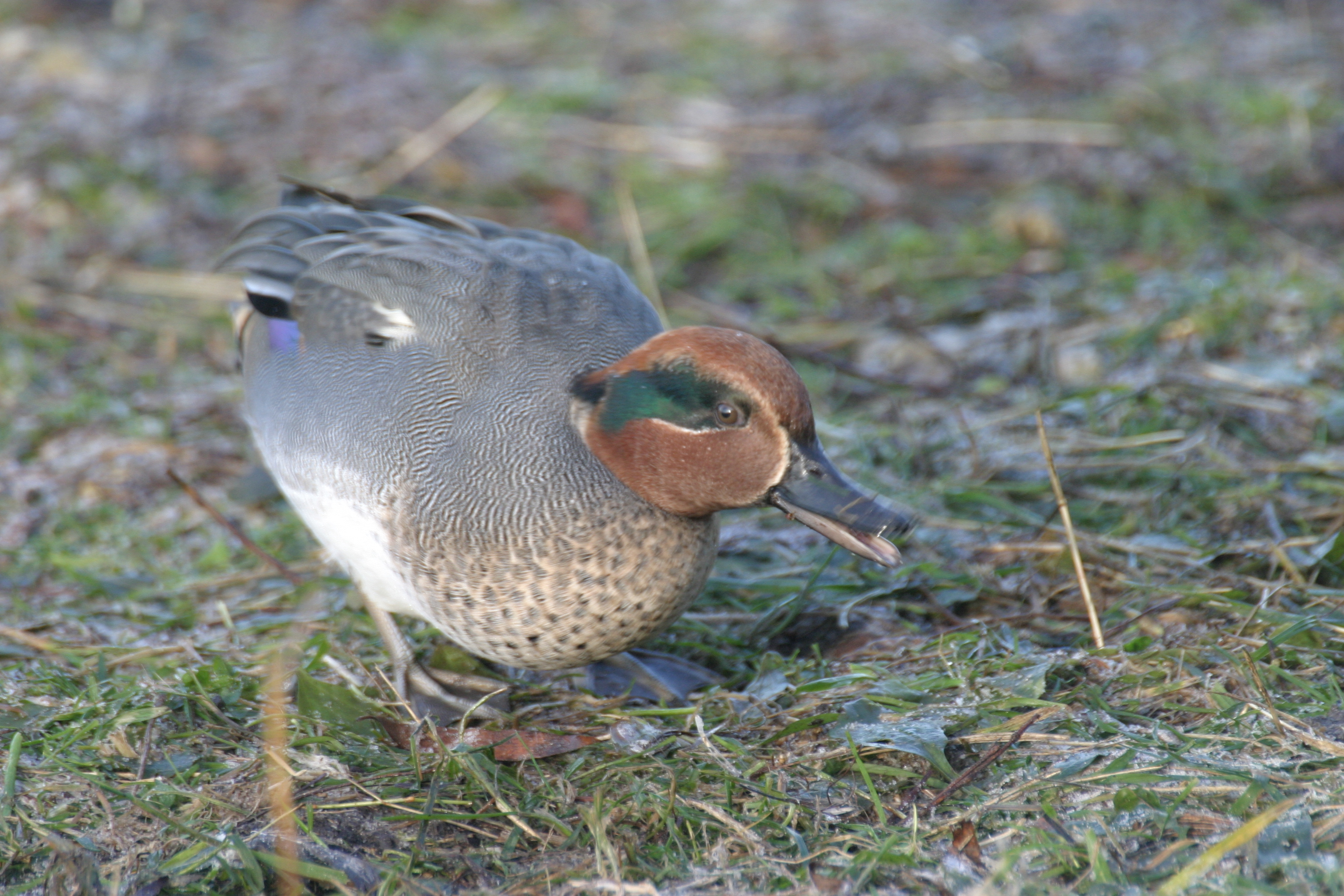
The common teal

There is a good network of footpaths in this area, allowing you to explore an interesting area with many ditches, wet fields and some damp pasture. At Swanton Court, the mediaeval moat can be seen from public footpaths. Swanton Mill used to be open to the public, but unfortunately has now closed. It can still be viewed from footpaths passing close-by.

The bird life of this area reflects the abundance of water and includes teal and heron.

=== Victoria Park ===
Victoria Park is a formal park with mature ornamental trees, and a small area of woodland. Some of the trees were planted in the early part of the 20th century to commemorate local townspeople and members of the royal family. A local art dealer donated the large fountain in one corner of the park to the town of Ashford. It was originally designed for the Great Exhibition and resided on the Olantigh Estate at Wye. There is a small pond at the bottom of the park surrounded by a rocky garden.

=== The Warren ===
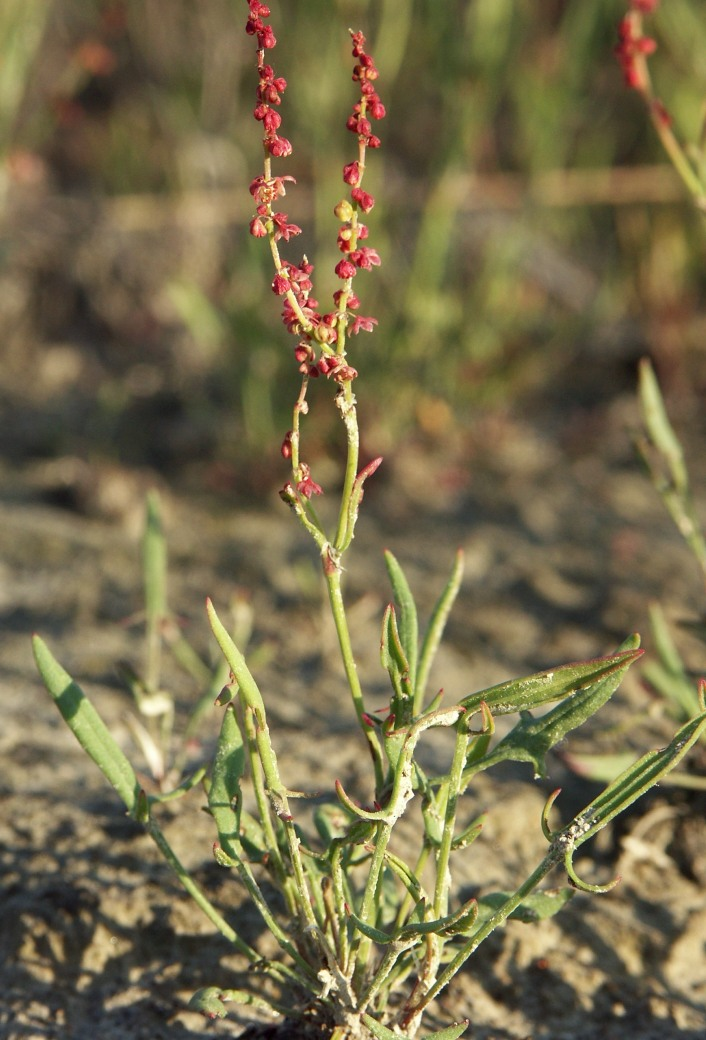
Sheep's sorrel

The woodlands, with their coppice and old oaks, screen the site from man-made intrusions, making it a green haven for the community. The Warren is also important for wildlife. The acid grasslands are unimproved, and contain plants such as sheep's sorrel and bird's foot. They are mown to maintain their value and keep birch scrub at bay. The ponds are home to amphibians, aquatic insects and the uncommon water violet. A wide variety of birds also inhabit the site.

=== Watercress Fields & Leacon Road ===
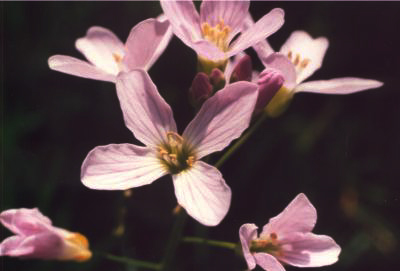
Cuckoo flower

Watercress Fields has formal football pitches and a play area as well as areas for informal recreation. It is an important site linking areas in the south of Ashford to the town centre and other parts of the Green Corridor. The river has a natural profile with many meanders, and wide margins of vegetation that support riverside species such as cuckoo flower and alder (some of the alders have succumbed to a disease – however dead wood is a good habitat for invertebrates). The river itself supports Water Voles, having sufficient food resources and bankside cover. The rest of the park has an open character that is interspersed with woodland gardens and areas of long grass that are important habitats for bird species and invertebrates. In the past it is thought that watercress may have been grown on the site. Further along the river at Leacon Road there are some riverside sculptures of aquatic wildlife and an old fording point that once linked this area with Beaver Lane.

=== Willesborough Lees ===
The Willesborough Lees is an area of wetland, pasture, rough grassland, scrub and woodland, covering nearly 100 acres (0.40 km^{2}) near Willesborough, and is a rich area for wildlife. Scarce plants that can be found include white sedge, recorded at only two other sites in Kent. The area is also good for mosses and liverworts. Grassland here is also of interest, but in places is becoming invaded with scrub. Uncommon shrubs include alder buckthorn and eared willow.
