= Willesborough =

Village in Kent, England

Coordinates: 51.1386°N 0.8957°E

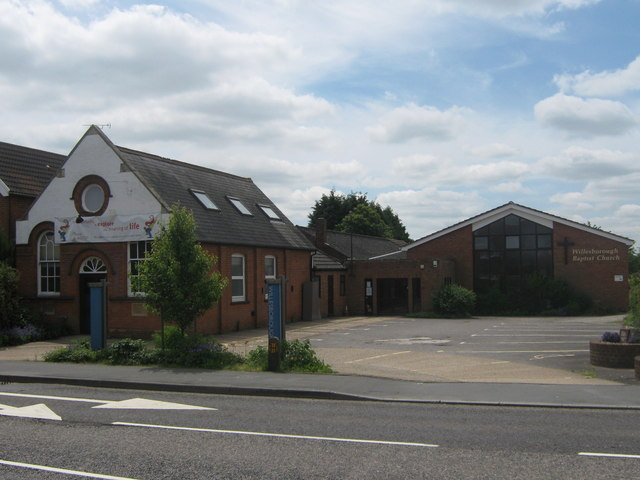
- New Wells Church (formerly Willesborough Baptist Church)

- Location within Kent
- Population: 7,800 (2005)
- OS grid reference: TR025417
- District: Ashford
- Shire county: Kent
- Region: South East
- Country: England
- Sovereign state: United Kingdom
- Post town: Ashford
- Postcode district: TN24
- Dialling code: 01233
- Police: Kent
- Fire: Kent
- Ambulance: South East Coast
- UK Parliament: Ashford

Willesborough is a residential suburb, on the eastern side of Ashford, in the county of Kent, England.

== The area ==
The South Willesborough Dykes area, on the west bank of the River East Stour, is an area of sheep fields drained by dykes. The area is designated as the South Willesborough Dykes Site of Nature Conservation Interest (SNCI). The dykes continue on the east side of the River East Stour and among the residential areas, and a tributary stream (Aylesford Stream) runs between Newtown and South Willesborough and into the East Stour. The smallest ditches dry up completely in summer.

The South Willesborough Dykes are important in terms of the geology of the area, being in the river floodplain and in supporting neutral, wet grassland species, along with Willesborough's Aylesford Green and Boys Hall forming part of the Ashford Green Corridor, although public access is otherwise limited.

Ashford Borough Council has a project to create the Willesborough Dykes Country Park.

There are a number of schools in and around the Willesborough area.

Willesborough is bordered by Ashford to the west and north-west, the M20 to the north, and Sevington and the new village of Finberry to the south-east.

== History ==
In 1184 Pope Lucius III wrote to the abbot of St. Augustine, Canterbury, suggesting that the parson of Willesborough retired and passed the benefice to his son who could then be free to pursue his studies.

Boys Hall was built by Thomas Boys in 1616. Its grounds are part of Ashford Green Corridor while the manor house is now an hotel.

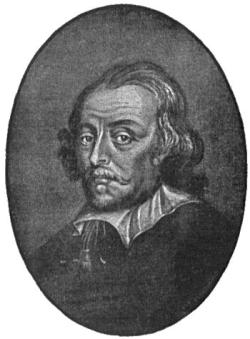
William Harvey (1578 - 1657)

The town is known for its 1869 windmill near Hythe Road, and St Mary's Church on Church Road, which has one of the oldest ringing bells in Kent.

Former English international cricketers Mark Ealham and Richard Ellison were born in Willesborough.

In 1931 the civil parish had a population of 4979. On 1 April 1932 the parish was abolished and merged with Ashford, Mersham, Hinxhill and Sevington. It is now in the unparished area of Ashford.

== Commerce ==
=== William Harvey Hospital ===
The William Harvey Hospital, a major hospital providing services for east Kent, is in Willesborough, and is named after the discoverer of the blood circulatory system. There is a statue of William Harvey at the hospital, and an older, damaged, statue of him, formerly the hospital, in the garden at the William Harvey Public House on Church Road in Willesborough.

=== Industry ===
Norman Cycles was a bicycle, autocycle, moped and motorbike manufacturer based in Ashford. The Norman Cycles Club is based at Willesborough Windmill and the Norman Museum is located in the windmill's barn, where mopeds and bicycles are on display.

=== Ashford Steam Centre ===
Between 1969 and 1976, Ashford Steam Centre operated at the former engine shed that served Ashford railway station.

== See also ==
- Listed buildings in South Willesborough and Newtown
