= Listed buildings in Wye with Hinxhill =

Civil Parish in Kent, England

Wye with Hinxhill is a village and civil parish in the Borough of Ashford of Kent, England. It contains four grade I, seven grade II*, 129 grade II listed buildings that are recorded in the National Heritage List for England.

This list is based on the information retrieved online from Historic England

== Key ==
Grade	Criteria
I	Buildings that are of exceptional interest
II*	Particularly important buildings of more than special interest
II	Buildings that are of special interest

== Listing ==
Name	Grade	Location	Type	Completed (Note: The date given is the date used by Historic England as significant for the initial building or that of an important part in the structure's description.)	Date designated	Grid ref. (Note: Sometimes known as OSGB36, the grid reference is based on the British national grid reference system used by the Ordnance Survey.) Geo-coordinates	Notes	Entry number (Note: The "List Entry Number" is a unique number assigned to each listed building and scheduled monument by Historic England.)	Image	Wikidata
Amage Farmhouse	II	Amage Road			27 November 1957	TR0722345864; 51°10′28″N 0°57′47″E		1034452	Upload Photo	Q26285993
Oast House at Coldharbour Farm	II	Amage Road			16 February 1989	TR0666746455; 51°10′48″N 0°57′20″E		1365295	Upload Photo	Q26646994
Outbuildings about 25 Metres South West of Amage Farmhouse	II	Amage Road			16 February 1989	TR0718745880; 51°10′29″N 0°57′45″E		1034451	Upload Photo	Q26285992
Pickersdane Cottage	II	Amage Road			16 February 1989	TR0745045018; 51°10′00″N 0°57′57″E		1034449	Upload Photo	Q26285990
Pickersdane Farmhouse	II	Amage Road			16 February 1989	TR0749245009; 51°10′00″N 0°57′59″E		1034450	Upload Photo	Q26285991
Fishponds Cottage	II	Brabourne Road			16 February 1989	TR0815844072; 51°09′29″N 0°58′32″E		1276281	Upload Photo	Q26565800
Newgate	II	Brabourne Road			16 February 1989	TR0776444800; 51°09′53″N 0°58′13″E		1034382	Upload Photo	Q26285924
Bramble Farmhouse	II	Bramble Lane			16 February 1989	TR0464547135; 51°11′12″N 0°55′37″E		1034453	Upload Photo	Q26285994
Honeysuckle Cottage	II	Bramble Lane			27 November 1957	TR0477146978; 51°11′07″N 0°55′43″E		1034411	Upload Photo	Q26285952
38 and 39, Bramble Lane	II	38 and 39, Bramble Lane, Bilting, TN25 5AB			16 February 1989	TR0403347950; 51°11′40″N 0°55′07″E		1234217	Upload Photo	Q26527635
Methodist Church and Church Hall	II	Bridge Street			16 February 1989	TR0533346672; 51°10′57″N 0°56′12″E		1034412	Upload Photo	Q26285953
Mill House Mill	II	Bridge Street			13 October 1952	TR0487846884; 51°11′04″N 0°55′49″E		1234206	Upload Photo	Q26527625
The Granary	II	Bridge Street, Wye, TN25 5ED			16 February 1989	TR0492146894; 51°11′04″N 0°55′51″E		1234207	Upload Photo	Q26527626
The Tickled Trout	II	Bridge Street			16 February 1989	TR0490646933; 51°11′06″N 0°55′50″E		1234209	Upload Photo	Q26527627
Undercroft at Entrance to Stonegate Egg Packing Station	II	Bridge Street			27 November 1957	TR0534746670; 51°10′57″N 0°56′12″E		1365315	Upload Photo	Q26647012
Wye Bridge	II*	Bridge Street			13 October 1952	TR0486446920; 51°11′05″N 0°55′48″E		1234208	Upload Photo	Q17556687
5 and 7, Bridge Street	II	5 and 7, Bridge Street			16 February 1989	TR0493346914; 51°11′05″N 0°55′52″E		1234270	Upload Photo	Q26527688
20, Bridge Street	II	20, Bridge Street			16 February 1989	TR0495046860; 51°11′03″N 0°55′52″E		1234238	Upload Photo	Q26527657
Almshouses	II	62-72, Bridge Street			27 November 1957	TR0506346770; 51°11′00″N 0°55′58″E		1234201	Upload Photo	Q26527620
63-73, Bridge Street	II	63-73, Bridge Street			27 November 1957	TR0507746793; 51°11′01″N 0°55′59″E		1276217	Upload Photo	Q26565745
77 and 79, Bridge Street	II	77 and 79, Bridge Street			16 February 1989	TR0509646778; 51°11′00″N 0°56′00″E		1234298	Upload Photo	Q26527715
87, Bridge Street	II	87, Bridge Street			16 February 1989	TR0512046771; 51°11′00″N 0°56′01″E		1234211	Upload Photo	Q26527629
89, 91 and 93, Bridge Street	II	89, 91 and 93, Bridge Street			27 November 1957	TR0513046768; 51°11′00″N 0°56′01″E		1234301	Upload Photo	Q26527718
95, Bridge Street	II	95, Bridge Street			27 November 1957	TR0513646765; 51°11′00″N 0°56′02″E		1276218	Upload Photo	Q26565746
97-103, Bridge Street	II	97-103, Bridge Street			27 November 1957	TR0514446761; 51°11′00″N 0°56′02″E		1234317	Upload Photo	Q26527735
104 and 106, Bridge Street	II	104 and 106, Bridge Street			27 November 1957	TR0515746742; 51°10′59″N 0°56′03″E		1234222	Upload Photo	Q26527640
105, Bridge Street	II	105, Bridge Street			27 November 1957	TR0515746757; 51°11′00″N 0°56′03″E		1234213	Upload Photo	Q26527631
108, Bridge Street	II	108, Bridge Street			16 February 1989	TR0517046737; 51°10′59″N 0°56′03″E		1234197	Upload Photo	Q26527616
111, 113 and 115, Bridge Street	II	111, 113 and 115, Bridge Street			27 November 1957	TR0518746749; 51°10′59″N 0°56′04″E		1276219	Upload Photo	Q26565747
114, Bridge Street	II	114, Bridge Street			16 February 1989	TR0518246731; 51°10′59″N 0°56′04″E		1234166	Upload Photo	Q26527586
George House	II	119, Bridge Street, Wye, TN25 5ED			27 November 1957	TR0521246741; 51°10′59″N 0°56′06″E		1234359	Upload Photo	Q26527772
120, Bridge Street	II	120, Bridge Street			16 February 1989	TR0521446723; 51°10′58″N 0°56′06″E		1034417	Upload Photo	Q26285959
122, 124 and 126, Bridge Street	II	122, 124 and 126, Bridge Street			27 November 1957	TR0522346719; 51°10′58″N 0°56′06″E		1034416	Upload Photo	Q26285958
123 and 125, Bridge Street	II	123 and 125, Bridge Street			27 November 1957	TR0523946732; 51°10′59″N 0°56′07″E		1234214	Upload Photo	Q26527632
127, Bridge Street	II	127, Bridge Street			27 November 1957	TR0525046730; 51°10′59″N 0°56′08″E		1234373	Upload Photo	Q26527782
Old Swan House	II*	134-140, Bridge Street			27 November 1957	TR0526446706; 51°10′58″N 0°56′08″E		1365318	Upload Photo	Q17556970
137 and 139, Bridge Street	II	137 and 139, Bridge Street			16 February 1989	TR0528646717; 51°10′58″N 0°56′09″E		1276220	Upload Photo	Q26565748
148/150, Bridge Street	II	148/150, Bridge Street			16 February 1989	TR0530846689; 51°10′57″N 0°56′10″E		1034415	Upload Photo	Q26285956
152, 154, 156 and 158, Bridge Street	II	152, 154, 156 and 158, Bridge Street			16 February 1989	TR0531546686; 51°10′57″N 0°56′11″E		1034413	Upload Photo	Q26285954
Barn/garage about 25 Metres West of Chelsbourne	II	Brook Road, Wye			16 February 1989	TR0731244949; 51°09′58″N 0°57′50″E		1234215	Upload Photo	Q26527633
Barns about 20 Metres North of Sankey Farmhouse	II	Brook Road			16 February 1989	TR0718444929; 51°09′58″N 0°57′43″E		1235052	Upload Photo	Q26528412
Chelsbourne	II	Brook Road			27 November 1957	TR0732444928; 51°09′58″N 0°57′50″E		1276143	Upload Photo	Q26565679
Sankey Farmhouse	II	Brook Road			16 February 1989	TR0716944908; 51°09′57″N 0°57′42″E		1234216	Upload Photo	Q26527634
Cockles Hall	II	Canterbury Road			16 February 1989	TR0385047722; 51°11′32″N 0°54′58″E		1276222	Upload Photo	Q26565750
Perry Court	II	Canterbury Road			16 February 1989	TR0372847276; 51°11′18″N 0°54′50″E		1275744	Upload Photo	Q26565304
2, Cherry Gardens Lane	II	2, Cherry Gardens Lane			16 February 1989	TR0550546646; 51°10′56″N 0°56′20″E		1216721	Upload Photo	Q26511484
6, Cherry Gardens Lane	II	6, Cherry Gardens Lane			16 February 1989	TR0551346629; 51°10′55″N 0°56′21″E		1234218	Upload Photo	Q26527636
The King's Head	II	Church Street			16 February 1989	TR0536146777; 51°11′00″N 0°56′13″E		1216803	Upload Photo	Q26511559
1, 3, And 5	II	1, 3, And 5, Church Street			16 February 1989	TR0534446711; 51°10′58″N 0°56′12″E		1216760	Upload Photo	Q26511521
2, Church Street	II	2, Church Street			27 November 1957	TR0535646693; 51°10′57″N 0°56′13″E		1275726	Upload Photo	Q26565287
4 and 6, Church Street	II	4 and 6, Church Street			16 February 1989	TR0536146708; 51°10′58″N 0°56′13″E		1216759	Upload Photo	Q26511520
7, Church Street	II	7, Church Street			16 February 1989	TR0534846724; 51°10′58″N 0°56′13″E		1216761	Upload Photo	Q26511522
Little Lords	II	8, Church Street			13 October 1952	TR0536546725; 51°10′58″N 0°56′13″E		1275725	Upload Photo	Q26565286
9 and 11, Church Street	II	9 and 11, Church Street			16 February 1989	TR0535046734; 51°10′59″N 0°56′13″E		1275727	Upload Photo	Q26565288
10 and 12, Church Street	II	10 and 12, Church Street			27 November 1957	TR0536946733; 51°10′59″N 0°56′14″E		1216758	Upload Photo	Q26511519
13, Church Street	II	13, Church Street			16 February 1989	TR0535146744; 51°10′59″N 0°56′13″E		1216762	Upload Photo	Q26511523
14 and 16, Church Street	II	14 and 16, Church Street			27 November 1957	TR0537446744; 51°10′59″N 0°56′14″E		1216768	Upload Photo	Q26511529
Swan House	II	15, Church Street			13 October 1952	TR0535346750; 51°10′59″N 0°56′13″E		1275728	Upload Photo	Q26565289
17, 19 and 21, Church Street	II	17, 19 and 21, Church Street			27 November 1957	TR0535746764; 51°11′00″N 0°56′13″E		1275711	Upload Photo	Q26565273
18 and 20, Church Street	II	18 and 20, Church Street			27 November 1957	TR0537946753; 51°10′59″N 0°56′14″E		1216766	Upload Photo	Q26511527
22, Church Street	II	22, Church Street			16 February 1989	TR0538246760; 51°10′59″N 0°56′14″E		1275753	Upload Photo	Q26565313
Cumberland Court	II	24, Church Street, Wye, TN25 5BJ			27 November 1957	TR0538546770; 51°11′00″N 0°56′15″E		1216765	Upload Photo	Q26511526
26 and 26a, Church Street	II	26 and 26a, Church Street			27 November 1957	TR0538846782; 51°11′00″N 0°56′15″E		1216764	Upload Photo	Q26511525
30-32 and 34 (cragmore House), Church Street	II	30-32 and 34 (cragmore House), Church Street, Wye, TN25 5BL			27 November 1957	TR0539946801; 51°11′01″N 0°56′15″E		1275752	Upload Photo	Q26565312
The Bailiffs House	II*	36, Church Street, Wye, TN25 5BL			27 November 1957	TR0541346815; 51°11′01″N 0°56′16″E		1216736	Upload Photo	Q17556419
39, Church Street	II	39, Church Street			16 February 1989	TR0537446823; 51°11′01″N 0°56′14″E		1275712	Upload Photo	Q26565274
Cornercroft	II	41, Church Street			16 February 1989	TR0537446831; 51°11′02″N 0°56′14″E		1216804	Upload Photo	Q26511560
Wye College	I	Cloister Quadrangle, High Street			13 October 1952	TR0549046858; 51°11′02″N 0°56′20″E		1275610	Upload Photo	Q127255762
Wye College	II	Entrance And Hall Quadrangles, High Street			13 October 1952	TR0552146849; 51°11′02″N 0°56′22″E		1217079	Upload Photo	Q26511821
Harville Farmhouse	II	Harville Road			16 February 1989	TR0444546659; 51°10′57″N 0°55′26″E		1216832	Upload Photo	Q26511586
Spring Grove and Walled Garden Attached	II*	Harville Road			13 October 1952	TR0425046687; 51°10′58″N 0°55′16″E		1216831	Upload Photo	Q17556427
Springrove Farmhouse	II	Harville Road			27 November 1957	TR0414446623; 51°10′57″N 0°55′10″E		1275686	Upload Photo	Q26565249
Stable Block about 20 Metres East of Harville Farmhouse	II	Harville Road			16 February 1989	TR0447046659; 51°10′57″N 0°55′27″E		1216834	Upload Photo	Q26511588
Stable/granary about 20 Metres South of Harville Farmhouse	II	Harville Road			16 February 1989	TR0444046624; 51°10′56″N 0°55′26″E		1216833	Upload Photo	Q26511587
Chest Tomb to John Oliver	II	About 2 Metres South Of Church Of Saint Gregory And Saint Martin, High Street			16 February 1989	TR0541446889; 51°11′04″N 0°56′16″E		1217074	Upload Photo	Q26511816
Church of Saint Gregory and Saint Martin	I	High Street			27 November 1957	TR0540846904; 51°11′04″N 0°56′16″E		1217135	Upload Photo	Q2318696
Group of 7 Headstones about 50 Metres North East of Church of Saint Gregory and Saint Martin	II	High Street			16 February 1989	TR0546546917; 51°11′04″N 0°56′19″E		1217078	Upload Photo	Q26511820
Headstone to Thomas and John Hudson about 3 Metres North East of Church of Saint Gregory and Saint Martin	II	High Street			16 February 1989	TR0542446912; 51°11′04″N 0°56′17″E		1217077	Upload Photo	Q26511819
Monument with Urn about 40 Metres South East of Church of Saint Gregory and Saint Martin	II	High Street			16 February 1989	TR0542446866; 51°11′03″N 0°56′17″E		1217022	Upload Photo	Q26511764
Obelisk about 20 Metres East of Church of Saint Gregory and Saint Martin	II	High Street			16 February 1989	TR0544046896; 51°11′04″N 0°56′18″E		1275608	Upload Photo	Q26565180
Railed Chest Tomb about 20 Metres North West of Church of Saint Gregory and Saint Martin	II	High Street			16 February 1989	TR0539846937; 51°11′05″N 0°56′16″E		1217076	Upload Photo	Q26511818
The Latin School Wye College	I	High Street			13 October 1952	TR0546446834; 51°11′02″N 0°56′19″E		1217080	Upload Photo	Q17529371
The Wheel House (junior Common Room) Walls and Gates Attached	II*	High Street			27 November 1957	TR0549246833; 51°11′02″N 0°56′20″E		1275530	Upload Photo	Q17556719
2-4, High Street	II	2-4, High Street, Wye, TN25 5AL			16 February 1989	TR0542146830; 51°11′02″N 0°56′17″E		1275652	Upload Photo	Q26565217
32, High Street	II	32, High Street			16 February 1989	TR0553246793; 51°11′00″N 0°56′22″E		1217015	Upload Photo	Q26511757
34, High Street	II	34, High Street			16 February 1989	TR0553946791; 51°11′00″N 0°56′23″E		1216924	Upload Photo	Q26511675
36, High Street	II	36, High Street			27 November 1957	TR0554646790; 51°11′00″N 0°56′23″E		1216923	Upload Photo	Q26511674
38, 40 and 42, High Street	II	38, 40 and 42, High Street			27 November 1957	TR0556146785; 51°11′00″N 0°56′24″E		1216922	Upload Photo	Q26511673
Barn about 20 Metres North of Goodcheap Farmhouse	II	Hinxhill			16 February 1989	TR0473843326; 51°09′09″N 0°55′34″E		1217084	Upload Photo	Q26511825
Barn/stable Block at Little Plumpton (tr 053429)	II	Hinxhill			16 February 1989	TR0524642912; 51°08′55″N 0°55′59″E		1217082	Upload Photo	Q26511823
Chest Tomb and 2 Headstones about 1 Metre South of Church of St Mary	II	Hinxhill			16 February 1989	TR0487042614; 51°08′46″N 0°55′40″E		1217366	Upload Photo	Q26512093
Church of St Mary	I	Hinxhill			27 November 1957	TR0486142619; 51°08′46″N 0°55′39″E		1275459	Upload Photo	Q17529410
Court Lodge and Garden Wall	II	Hinxhill			16 February 1989	TR0493342560; 51°08′44″N 0°55′43″E		1275572	Upload Photo	Q26565146
Court Lodge Cottages	II	Hinxhill			16 February 1989	TR0490242603; 51°08′46″N 0°55′41″E		1217374	Upload Photo	Q26512100
Goodcheap Farmhouse and Wall Projecting	II	Hinxhill			27 November 1957	TR0472643304; 51°09′09″N 0°55′34″E		1275440	Upload Photo	Q26565025
Great Bromley Farmhouse	II	Hinxhill			27 November 1957	TR0387443811; 51°09′26″N 0°54′51″E		1217382	Upload Photo	Q26512108
Rock Cottages	II	Hinxhill			16 February 1989	TR0484542860; 51°08′54″N 0°55′39″E		1217083	Upload Photo	Q26511824
Trees	II	Hinxhill			16 February 1989	TR0483442312; 51°08′36″N 0°55′37″E		1275574	Upload Photo	Q26565147
Sillibourne Farmhouse	II	Naccolt Road			18 January 1977	TR0540843998; 51°09′30″N 0°56′10″E		1275443	Upload Photo	Q26565028
Stables/barn	II	Now Wye College Laundry, Old Parsonage Car Park			16 February 1989	TR0541346722; 51°10′58″N 0°56′16″E		1217540	Upload Photo	Q26512255
Gates and Quadrant Walls to Olantigh	II	Olantigh Road			16 February 1989	TR0614348405; 51°11′52″N 0°56′57″E		1217538	Upload Photo	Q26512253
K6 Telephone Kiosk at Junction with Scotton Street	II	Olantigh Road			11 March 1988	TR0557646807; 51°11′01″N 0°56′24″E		1217539	Upload Photo	Q26512254
Olantigh; Garden Terraces and Stable Block	II	Olantigh Road			16 February 1989	TR0596248489; 51°11′55″N 0°56′48″E		1275362	Upload Photo	Q7083100
Wye Court	II	Olantigh Road			27 November 1957	TR0542047256; 51°11′15″N 0°56′17″E		1217383	Upload Photo	Q26512109
Ouseley Farmhouse	II	Plumpton Lane			16 February 1989	TR0495342214; 51°08′33″N 0°55′43″E		1217541	Upload Photo	Q26512256
Yew Trees	II*	Scotton Street			13 October 1952	TR0570946760; 51°10′59″N 0°56′31″E		1217546	Upload Photo	Q17556467
2, Scotton Street	II	2, Scotton Street			16 February 1989	TR0560646784; 51°11′00″N 0°56′26″E		1217542	Upload Photo	Q26512257
Nos 1	II	3 and 5 And Railed Forecourt, Scotton Street			27 November 1957	TR0558646807; 51°11′01″N 0°56′25″E		1217543	Upload Photo	Q26512258
7, Scotton Street	II	7, Scotton Street			16 February 1989	TR0560246806; 51°11′01″N 0°56′26″E		1217544	Upload Photo	Q26512259
12-22, Scotton Street	II	12-22, Scotton Street			14 November 1985	TR0563846785; 51°11′00″N 0°56′28″E		1275280	Upload Photo	Q26564884
24 and 26, Scotton Street	II	24 and 26, Scotton Street			16 February 1989	TR0565446782; 51°11′00″N 0°56′28″E		1217545	Upload Photo	Q26512260
25, 27 and 29, Scotton Street	II	25, 27 and 29, Scotton Street			16 February 1989	TR0567546794; 51°11′00″N 0°56′30″E		1275315	Upload Photo	Q26564916
28 and 30, Scotton Street	II	28 and 30, Scotton Street			27 November 1957	TR0566346779; 51°11′00″N 0°56′29″E		1275367	Upload Photo	Q26564961
Lychgate	II	Side Gate And Churchyard Walls To Churchyard Of Church Of St Mary, Hinxhill			16 February 1989	TR0485342638; 51°08′47″N 0°55′39″E		1217081	Upload Photo	Q26511822
The Old Flying Horse Inn	II*	1, 3 and 5, The Green			27 November 1957	TR0548046804; 51°11′01″N 0°56′20″E		1216805	Upload Photo	Q17556423
11, 13 and 15, The Green	II	11, 13 and 15, The Green			16 February 1989	TR0546446787; 51°11′00″N 0°56′19″E		1275715	Upload Photo	Q26565277
17, 19 and 21, The Green	II	17, 19 and 21, The Green			16 February 1989	TR0545646775; 51°11′00″N 0°56′18″E		1216808	Upload Photo	Q26511563
23-27, The Green	II	23-27, The Green			27 November 1957	TR0544746762; 51°10′59″N 0°56′18″E		1216807	Upload Photo	Q26511562
The Old Vicarage	II	29, The Green			27 November 1957	TR0543146759; 51°10′59″N 0°56′17″E		1216806	Upload Photo	Q26511561
The Former Post Office	II	35-37, The Green			27 November 1957	TR0539846781; 51°11′00″N 0°56′15″E		1275713	Upload Photo	Q26565275
Iron Hand Pump in the Grounds of Oxenturn Cottage	II	Upper Bridge Street			16 February 1989	TR0545146648; 51°10′56″N 0°56′18″E		1217553	Upload Photo	Q26512267
James Wyllie House	II	Upper Bridge Street			16 February 1989	TR0550346719; 51°10′58″N 0°56′21″E		1217551	Upload Photo	Q26512265
K6 Telephone Kiosk Opposite Junction with Church Street	II	Upper Bridge Street			11 March 1988	TR0535046677; 51°10′57″N 0°56′13″E		1217733	Upload Photo	Q26512435
Oxenturn House	II	Upper Bridge Street, Wye, TN25 5AW			16 February 1989	TR0545746638; 51°10′55″N 0°56′18″E		1275364	Upload Photo	Q26564959
The New Flying Horse	II	Upper Bridge Street			27 November 1957	TR0555546726; 51°10′58″N 0°56′23″E		1217550	Upload Photo	Q26512264
1, Upper Bridge Street	II	1, Upper Bridge Street			27 November 1957	TR0536546687; 51°10′57″N 0°56′13″E		1275288	Upload Photo	Q26564891
4, Upper Bridge Street	II	4, Upper Bridge Street, Wye, TN25 5AF			16 February 1989	TR0536346667; 51°10′56″N 0°56′13″E		1217549	Upload Photo	Q26512263
Public Library	II	6, Upper Bridge Street			27 November 1957	TR0537946662; 51°10′56″N 0°56′14″E		1217723	Upload Photo	Q26512426
7, Upper Bridge Street	II	7, Upper Bridge Street			16 February 1989	TR0538946677; 51°10′57″N 0°56′15″E		1217548	Upload Photo	Q26512262
80, Upper Bridge Street	II	80, Upper Bridge Street			27 November 1957	TR0558846773; 51°11′00″N 0°56′25″E		1217766	Upload Photo	Q26512464
Barn about 10 Metres South West of Winterbourne	II	Withersdane			16 February 1989	TR0640345880; 51°10′30″N 0°57′05″E		1221236	Upload Photo	Q26515647
Barn about 30 Metres East of Winterbourne	II	Withersdane			16 February 1989	TR0648045889; 51°10′30″N 0°57′09″E		1217570	Upload Photo	Q26512281
Garden Walls and Walled Garden Surrounding and Attached to Withersdane House	II	Withersdane			16 February 1989	TR0610745786; 51°10′27″N 0°56′50″E		1217789	Upload Photo	Q26512485
Handley Cross	II	Withersdane			16 February 1989	TR0569445840; 51°10′29″N 0°56′29″E		1275222	Upload Photo	Q26564827
Stable/granary about 10 Metres South of Withersdane House	II	Withersdane			16 February 1989	TR0608645753; 51°10′26″N 0°56′49″E		1217567	Upload Photo	Q26512278
Winterbourne	II	Withersdane			16 February 1989	TR0642145886; 51°10′30″N 0°57′06″E		1217569	Upload Photo	Q26512280
Withersdane House	II	Withersdane			27 November 1957	TR0609945775; 51°10′27″N 0°56′49″E		1217777	Upload Photo	Q26512474
Barn about 20 Metres South East of Withersdane House	II				16 February 1989	TR0610645750; 51°10′26″N 0°56′50″E		1217568	Upload Photo	Q26512279
Down Farmhouse	II				16 February 1989	TR0761146915; 51°11′02″N 0°58′09″E		1034447	Upload Photo	Q26285989
Walled Garden and Outhouses at Olantigh Nurseries	II				16 February 1989	TR0656848403; 51°11′51″N 0°57′19″E		1365293	Upload Photo	Q26646992

== See also ==
- Grade I listed buildings in Kent
- Grade II* listed buildings in Kent

== Sources ==
- Newman, John (2012) [1969], Kent: West and the Weald, The Buildings of England, New Haven and London: Yale University Press, ISBN 978-0-300-18509-6
