= Crundale, Kent =

Village in Kent, England

Coordinates: 51.20°N 0.97°E

Crundale
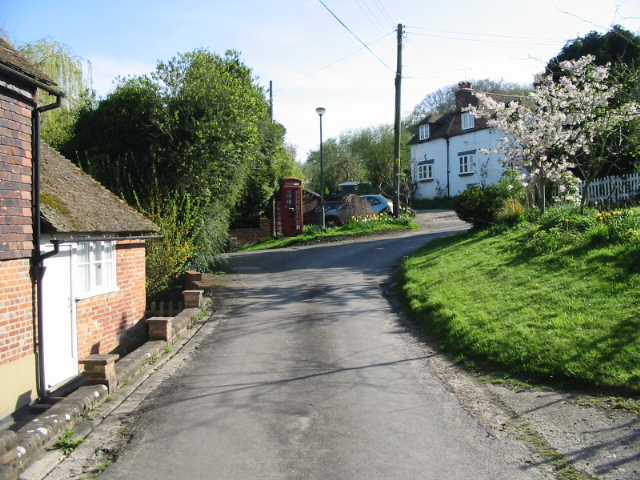

- Location within Kent
- Area: 6.39 km^{2} (2.47 sq mi)
- Population: 186 (Civil Parish 2011)
  - Density: 29/km^{2} (75/sq mi)
- OS grid reference: TR076493
- Civil parish: Crundale
- District: Ashford
- Shire county: Kent
- Region: South East
- Country: England
- Sovereign state: United Kingdom
- Post town: CANTERBURY
- Postcode district: CT4
- Dialling code: 01227
- Police: Kent
- Fire: Kent
- Ambulance: South East Coast
- UK Parliament: Weald of Kent
- Website: Crundale Parish Meeting

Crundale is a mostly rural village and civil parish in the Ashford District of Kent in southeast England. The village covers a section of one of the dual escarpments of the North Downs at this point, about halfway between Ashford and Canterbury.

== Geography ==
About a quarter of the village is woodland, and barring its western side which slopes steeply to the Great Stour, which is at 92 feet (28 metres) above sea level, most of the rest of its land is at more than 260 feet (79 metres) above Ordnance Datum.

== Amenities ==
The community living in the civil parish is relatively small - many of its activities are shared with the neighbouring parish of Godmersham.

== History ==
An early Anglo-Saxon gold buckle and other princely items from a grave dating from the mid-7th century were found in the Crundale Downs in 1861 and are now in the British Museum. The intricately designed object is notable for the representation of a three dimensional appliqué fish.

The early Norman parish church is dedicated to St Mary the Blessed Virgin and is a building listed in the highest category of the national system, at Grade I. It is on the escarpment of the Crundale Downs, a less eroded top layer of the escarpment, making it higher, about half a mile southeast of the village mainstay which is made up of dual clusters very close to each other and connected by road and by separate footpath. The tombs of Juliana Hervey and Reverend Francis Paine are separately listed.

== Recreation ==
The Stour Valley Walk runs north–south through the civil parish, linking to Canterbury and to Ashford.
