= Listed buildings in South Willesborough and Newtown =

Civil Parish in Kent, England

South Willesborough and Newtown is a village and civil parish in the Borough of Ashford of Kent, England. It contains eight grade II listed buildings that are recorded in the National Heritage List for England.

This list is based on the information retrieved online from Historic England

== Key ==
Grade	Criteria
I	Buildings that are of exceptional interest
II*	Particularly important buildings of more than special interest
II	Buildings that are of special interest

== Listing ==
Name	Grade	Location	Type	Completed (Note: The date given is the date used by Historic England as significant for the initial building or that of an important part in the structure's description.)	Date designated	Grid ref. (Note: Sometimes known as OSGB36, the grid reference is based on the British national grid reference system used by the Ordnance Survey.) Geo-coordinates	Notes	Entry number (Note: The "List Entry Number" is a unique number assigned to each listed building and scheduled monument by Historic England.)	Image	Wikidata
The Albion Inn	II	Albion Place, Willesborough			4 June 1976	TR0226541269; 51°08′06″N 0°53′23″E		1071134	Upload Photo	Q26326063
Gate House to Railway Works	II	Newton Road			4 June 1976	TR0158941668; 51°08′20″N 0°52′49″E		1362862	Upload Photo	Q26644725
Former Acetylene Store	II	Newtown Road			30 November 1984	TR0161541648; 51°08′19″N 0°52′50″E		1071021	Upload Photo	Q26325760
Paint Stores and Electroplating Shop	II	Newtown Road, Newtown Railway Works			18 September 2001	TR0184041498; 51°08′14″N 0°53′02″E		1389436	Upload Photo	Q26668870
Carriage Shop	II	Newtown Railway Works			18 September 2001	TR0153641787; 51°08′24″N 0°52′47″E		1389434	Upload Photo	Q26668868
Engine Shed	II	Newtown Railway Works			18 September 2001	TR0168541719; 51°08′21″N 0°52′54″E		1389435	Engine Shed More images	Q26668869
Locomotive Workshops at Newtown Railway Works	II	Newtown Railway Works			18 September 2001	TR0186041605; 51°08′17″N 0°53′03″E		1389437	Upload Photo	Q26668871
The Old School	II	Wainwright Place, TN24 0PF, Newtown			11 September 1985	TR0156741560; 51°08′16″N 0°52′48″E		1217768	Upload Photo	Q26512466

== See also ==
- Grade I listed buildings in Kent
- Grade II* listed buildings in Kent

== Sources ==
- Newman, John (2012) [1969], Kent: West and the Weald, The Buildings of England, New Haven and London: Yale University Press, ISBN 978-0-300-18509-6
