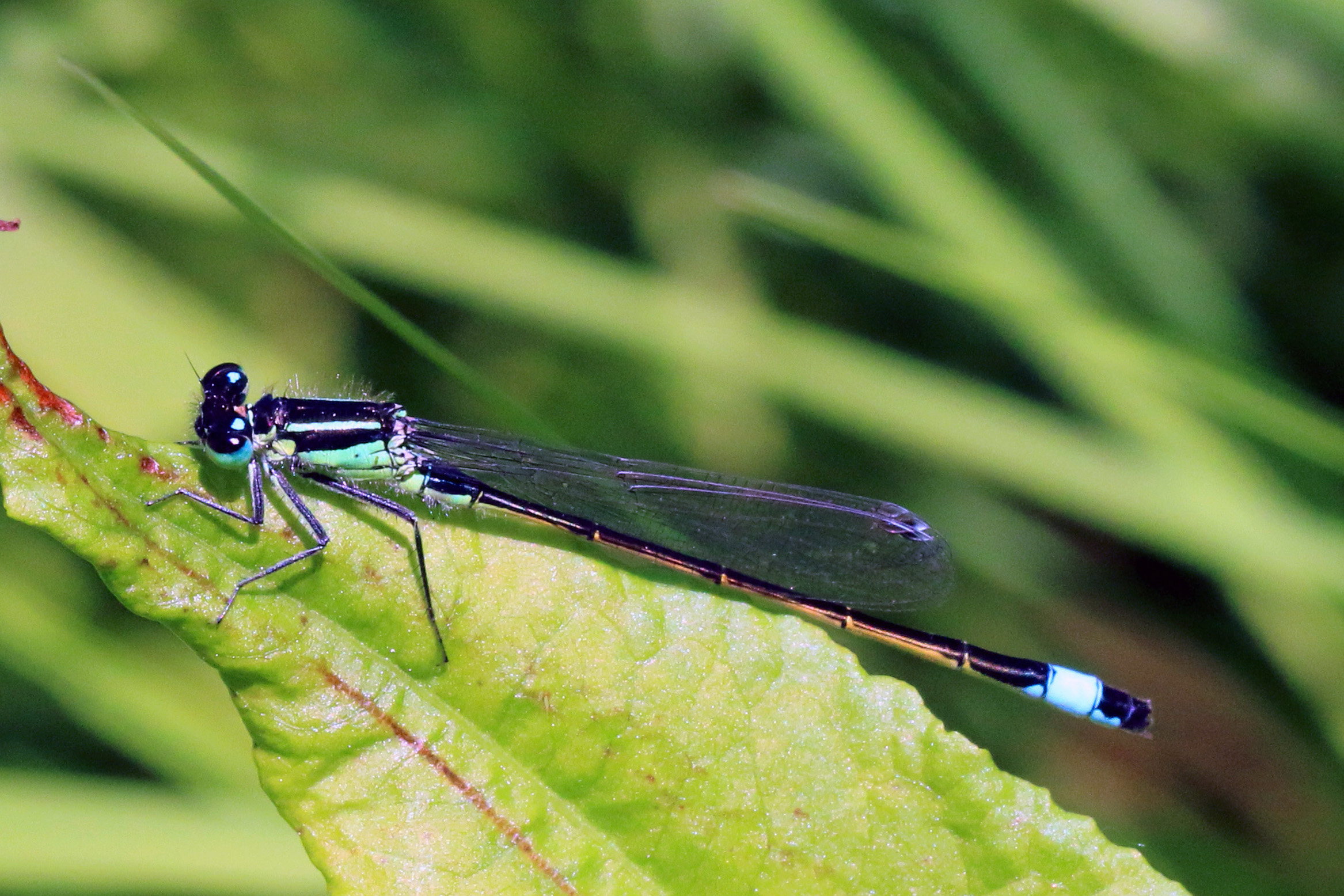
- Mature male
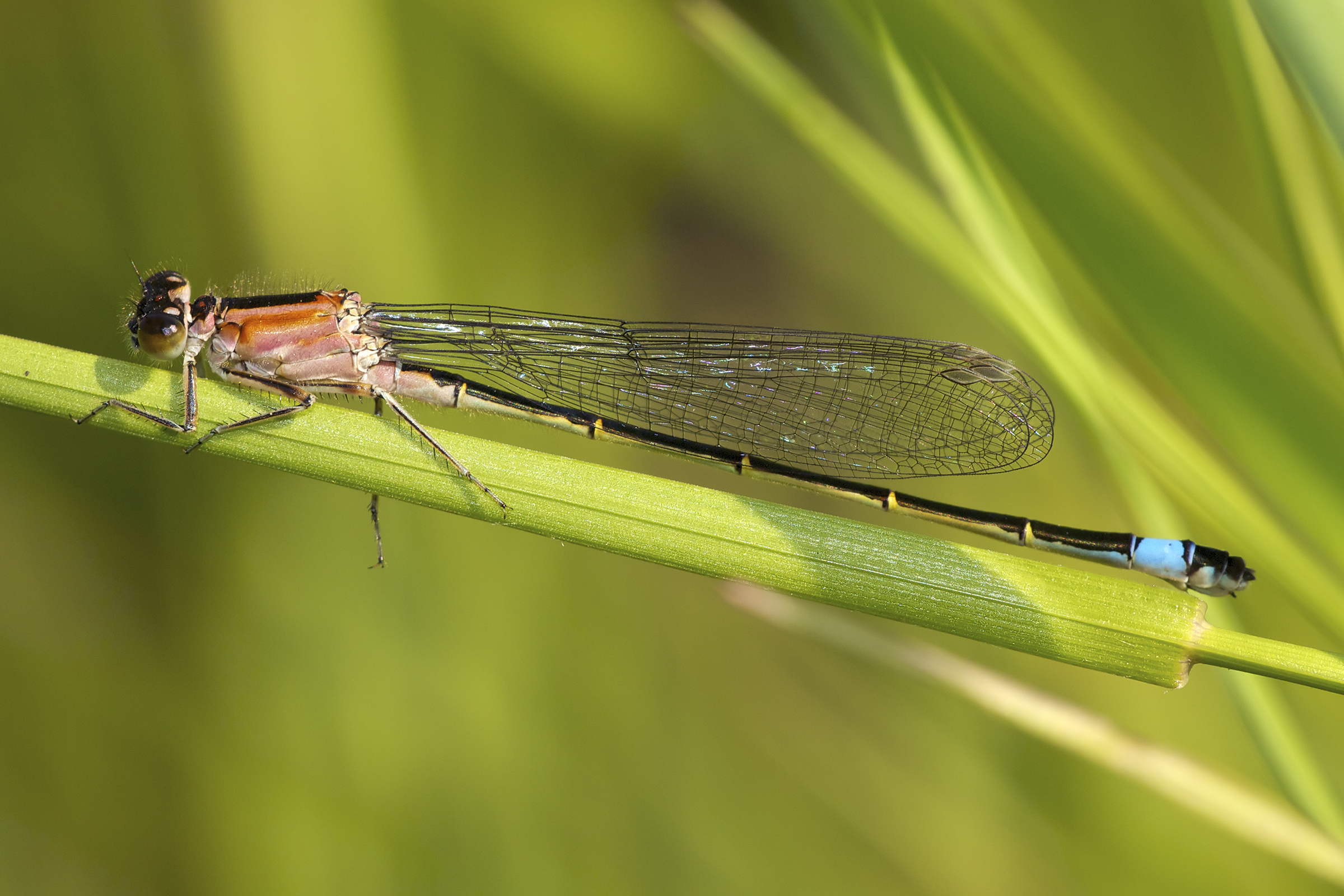
- Female, form rufescens

Scientific classification
- Kingdom: Animalia
- Phylum: Arthropoda
- Clade: Pancrustacea
- Class: Insecta
- Order: Odonata
- Suborder: Zygoptera
- Family: Coenagrionidae
- Genus: Ischnura
- Species: I. elegans

Binomial name
- Ischnura elegans (Vander Linden, 1820)

Synonyms
- Agrion elegans Vander Linden, 1820; Agrion rubens Evans, 1845; Ischnura lamellata Kolbe, 1885

= Blue-tailed damselfly =

Species of damselfly

The blue-tailed damselfly or common bluetail (Ischnura elegans) is a damselfly, belonging to the family Coenagrionidae.

== Subspecies and varieties ==
Subspecies and varieties include:

- Ischnura elegans ebneri Schmidt, 1938
- Ischnura elegans elegans (Vander Linden, 1820)
- Ischnura elegans pontica Schmidt, 1939
- Ischnura elegans f. infuscans
- Ischnura elegans f. infuscans-obsoleta
- Ischnura elegans f. rufescens
- Ischnura elegans f. typica
- Ischnura elegans f. violacea

== Distribution ==
This species is present in most of Europe and the Middle East. It is a common species.

== Habitat ==
These damselflies can be found in a wide range of lowland environments, with standing and slow flowing waters, brackish and polluted water.

== Description ==
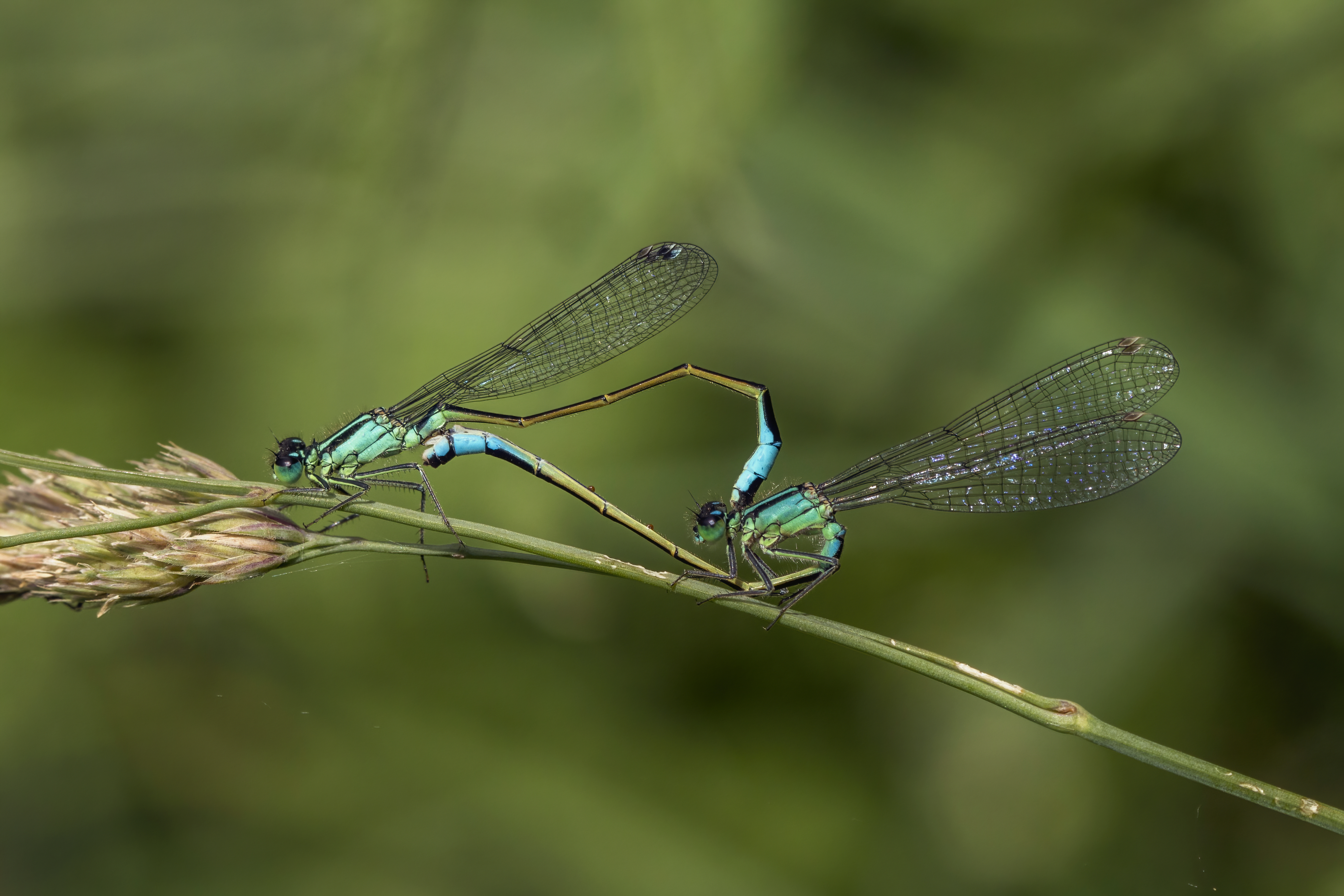
Two individuals mating

Ischnura elegans can reach a body length of 27–35 millimetres (1.1–1.4 in) and a wingspan of about 35 millimetres (1.4 in). Hindwings reach a length of 14–20 millimetres (0.55–0.79 in). Adult male blue-tailed damselflies have a head and thorax patterned with blue and black. There is a bi-coloured pterostigma on the front wings. Eyes are blue. They have a largely black abdomen with very narrow pale markings where each segment joins the next. Segment eight, however, is entirely pale blue. At rest, the wings of most damselfly species are held back together, unlike dragonflies, which rest with their wings out flat. The thorax of juvenile males has a green tinge.

Female blue-tailed Damselflies come in a variety of colour forms. Juveniles may be salmon pink, form rufescens; violet, form violacea and a pale green form. The colour darkens as the damselfly ages. Mature females may be blue like the male, form typica; olive green thorax and brown spot, form infuscans or pale brown thorax and brown spot, form infusca-obseleta.

== Biology and behavior ==
Adults fly from April to September to early October. The adult damselflies prey on small flying insects, caught using their legs like a basket to scoop the prey up while flying, or insects taken from leaves. Damselfly nymphs are aquatic, and prey on small aquatic insects or other aquatic larvae.

A male can try to interfere with a mating pair, by attaching itself to the mating male. The females always lay their eggs on the floating parts of the plants without any involvement of the male.

Blue-tailed damselflies are superb fliers and can alter each of their four wings' kinematics in order to maneuver. A recent study has shown that they can compensate for a whole wing loss and even successfully maneuver and catch prey.

== Female polymorphism ==
In damselfly populations, there is often a surplus of males displaying male mate harassment. In order to avoid unwanted mating attempts, female-limited polymorphisms have evolved that allow some of them to avoid recognition by males by mimicking male phenotypes. There are three specific morphs found in the Ischnura elegans species: androchromes, aurantiaca(rufescens) and infuscans. The androchromes resemble the male coloration, and the gynochromes, which can be either aurantiaca or infuscan, do not resemble males. The aurantiaca female morph is a pink-orange color with a blue abdominal patch that eventually disappears after maturation. The third morph, infuscan, displays an olive-green coloration with no color on its abdominal patch. Females are able to fully mature into their differing morph colorations just a few days after they finish their transition from aquatic larvae to their mature forms.

Although having an increased number of morphs makes it more difficult for males to distinguish between males from females, the levels of male mate harassment is different between the different morphs. Males primarily rely on visual cues to distinguish between the morphs and can also use odour cues, secondarily. Androchromes are often seen to face less male mate harassment because they resemble males and are less desired. This gives androchromes an advantage in that they are able to spend more time allowing their eggs to mature instead of exerting energy avoiding unwanted mating attempts. Along with that, the morphs also display different mate avoidance tactics. Androchromes are more likely to face off with males by spreading their wings and curling their abdomens while gynochromes tend to fly away to avoid mating. Despite potentially having more time for egg maturation, the androchromes are still disadvantaged because their abdomens, like males, are more narrow which prevents them from being able to carry as many eggs as gynochromes.

There are also five main hypotheses that attempt to understand how the different female polymorphisms are continually maintained in this species. The reproductive isolation hypothesis states that there is a greater predation pressure on androchromes, which is seen as a trade-off to maintain the more inconspicuous morph. The male-mimicry hypothesis, described above, proposes that the androchromes ability to mimic male coloration allows them to avoid unwanted mating attempts and allocate more time to egg maturation. The density-dependent hypothesis states that the maintenance of the polymorphisms is attributed to the changing population densities. The habituation hypothesis states that males are actually most attracted to the morph that is most abundant. Lastly, the neutral hypothesis proposes that the female morphs are maintained by genetic drift, mutations, and founders effect all working together as well as that they might be more neutral to selection.

== Mating and behavior ==
This species participates in a male scramble mate choice mating system in which a male's mating success is determined by how fast they are able to find a mate. This includes many hours of copulations in which males are unable to monopolize a single female and some males are often left with no mates at all. Due to this, the I. elegans species displays intense male-male competition which leads to males forcing copulations with females. Along with the lengthy copulations, the reproductive lifespan of this species is only a few weeks. Cooperation from both males and females is required for copulation and females have the ability to reject sperm transfer from unwanted mating attempts. A tandem formation is created by males through the clasping of the female pronotum.

I. elegans have the ability to rapidly adapt to their environments which puts them under heavy selective pressures. As this species has originated from tropical environments, their hatching times are often shorter in warmer temperatures than cooler temperatures. Females are also more likely to spend time near bodies of water as that is where they lay their eggs. In response to changing social contexts and population densities, males may change their sexual preferences and choose to mate with other males.

== Gallery ==
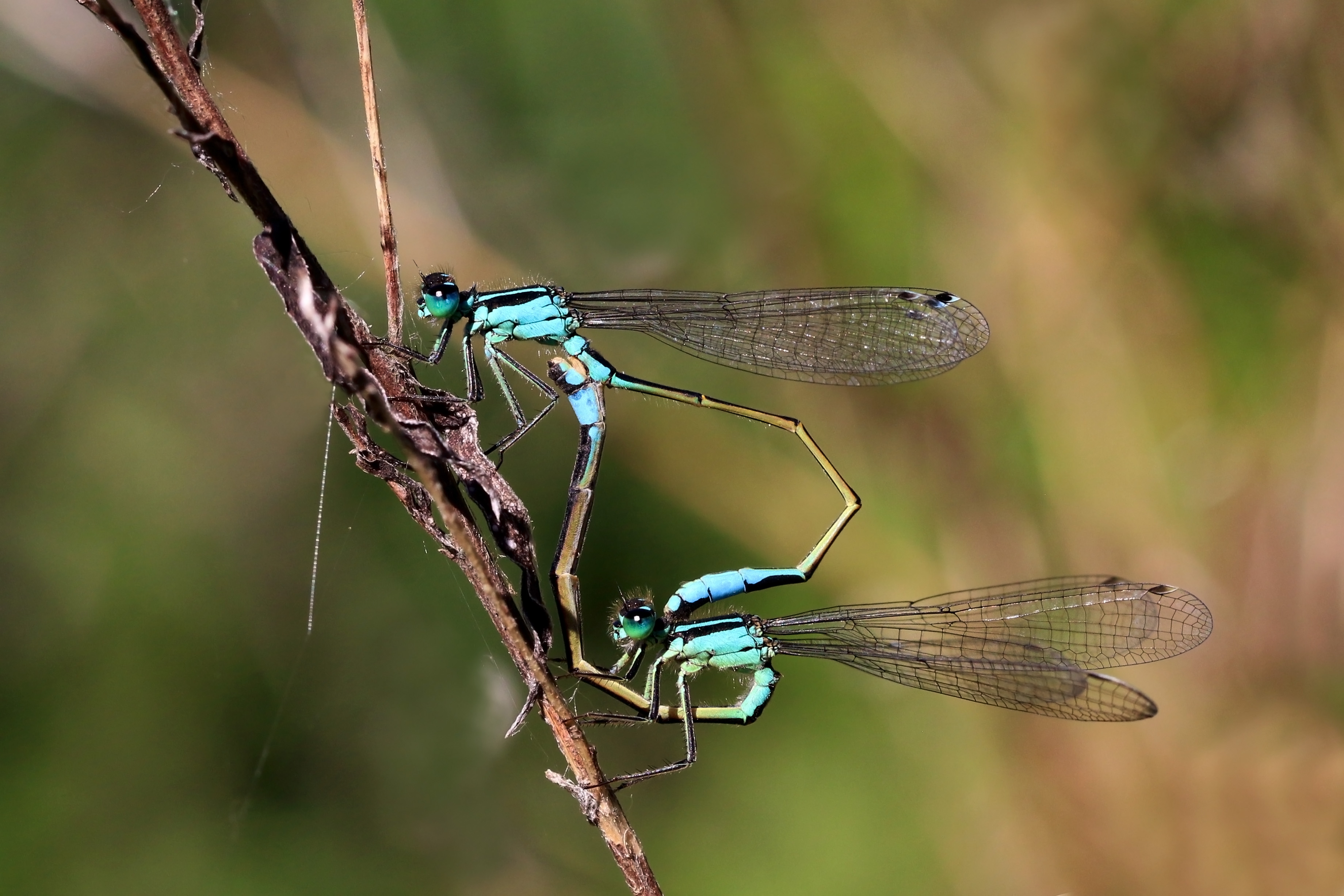
Mating, female f. typica

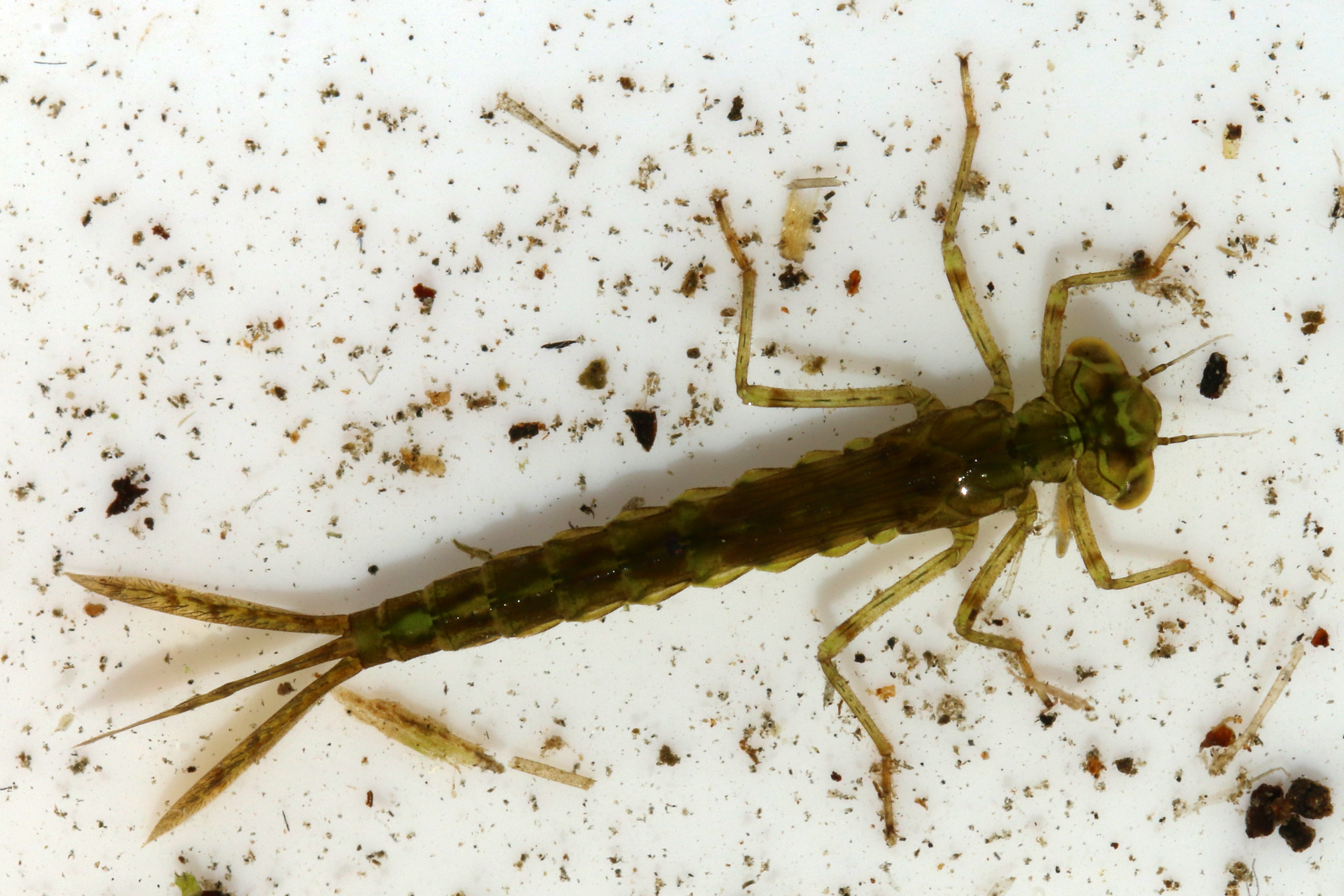
nymph

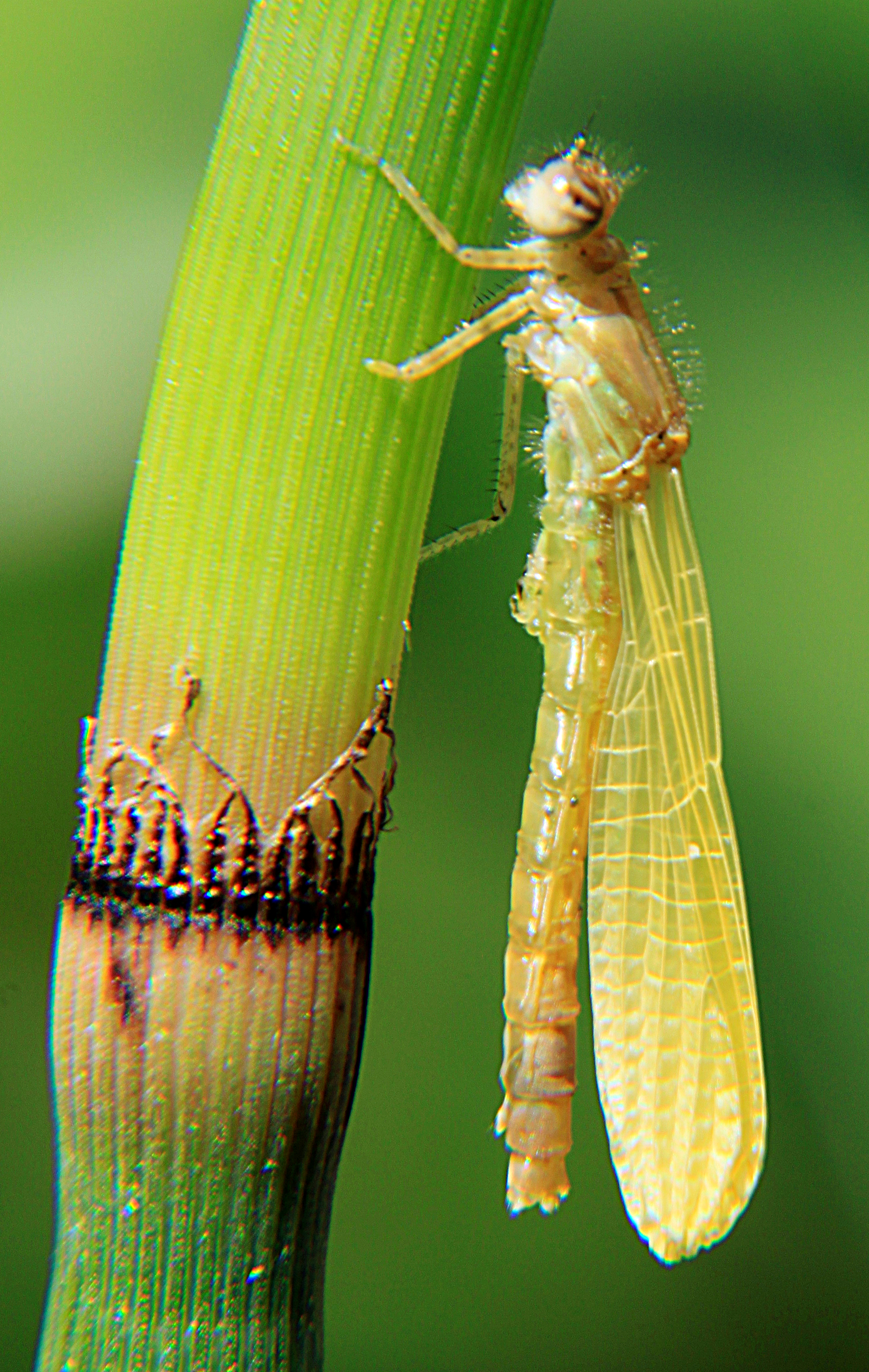
emerging

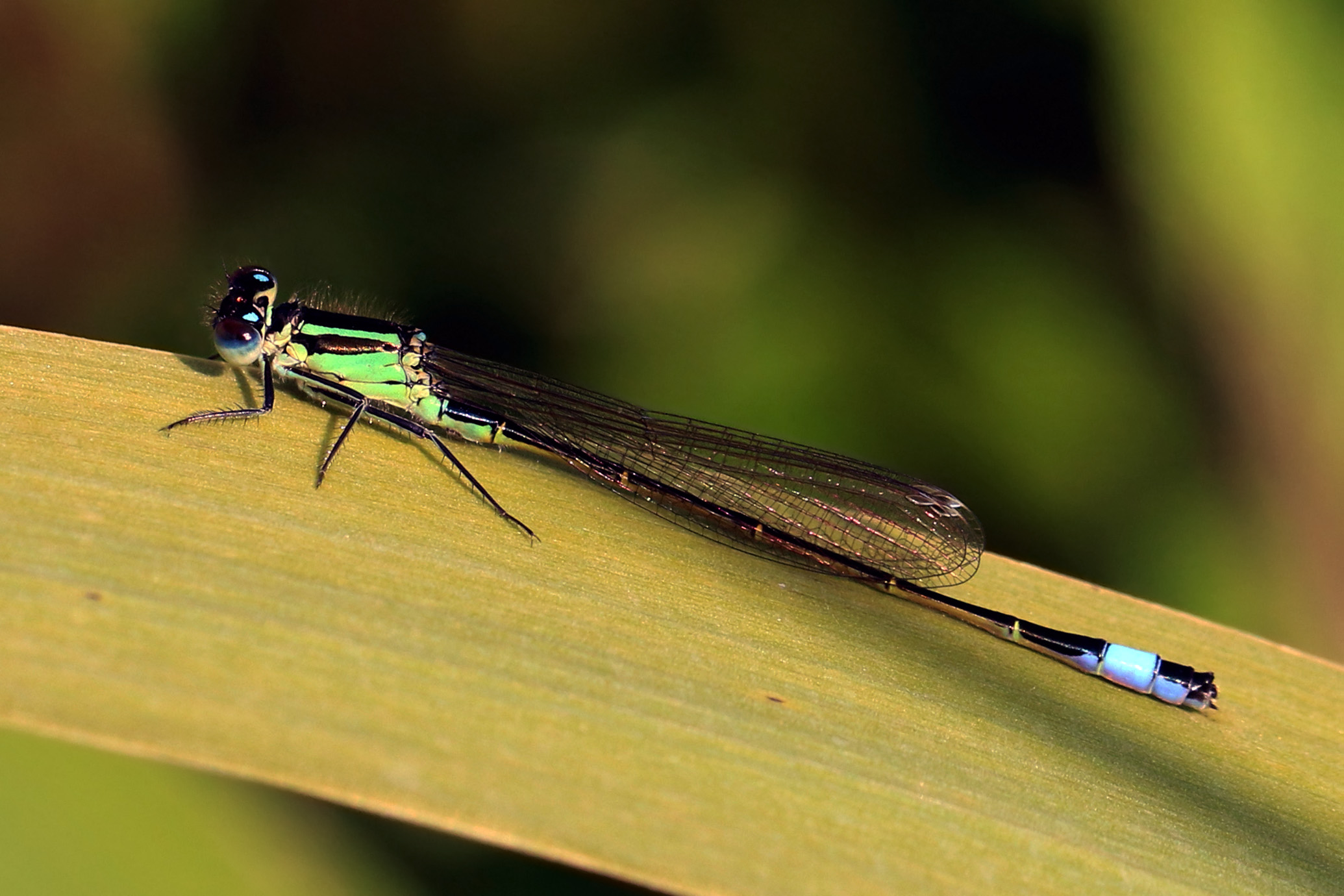
Immature male

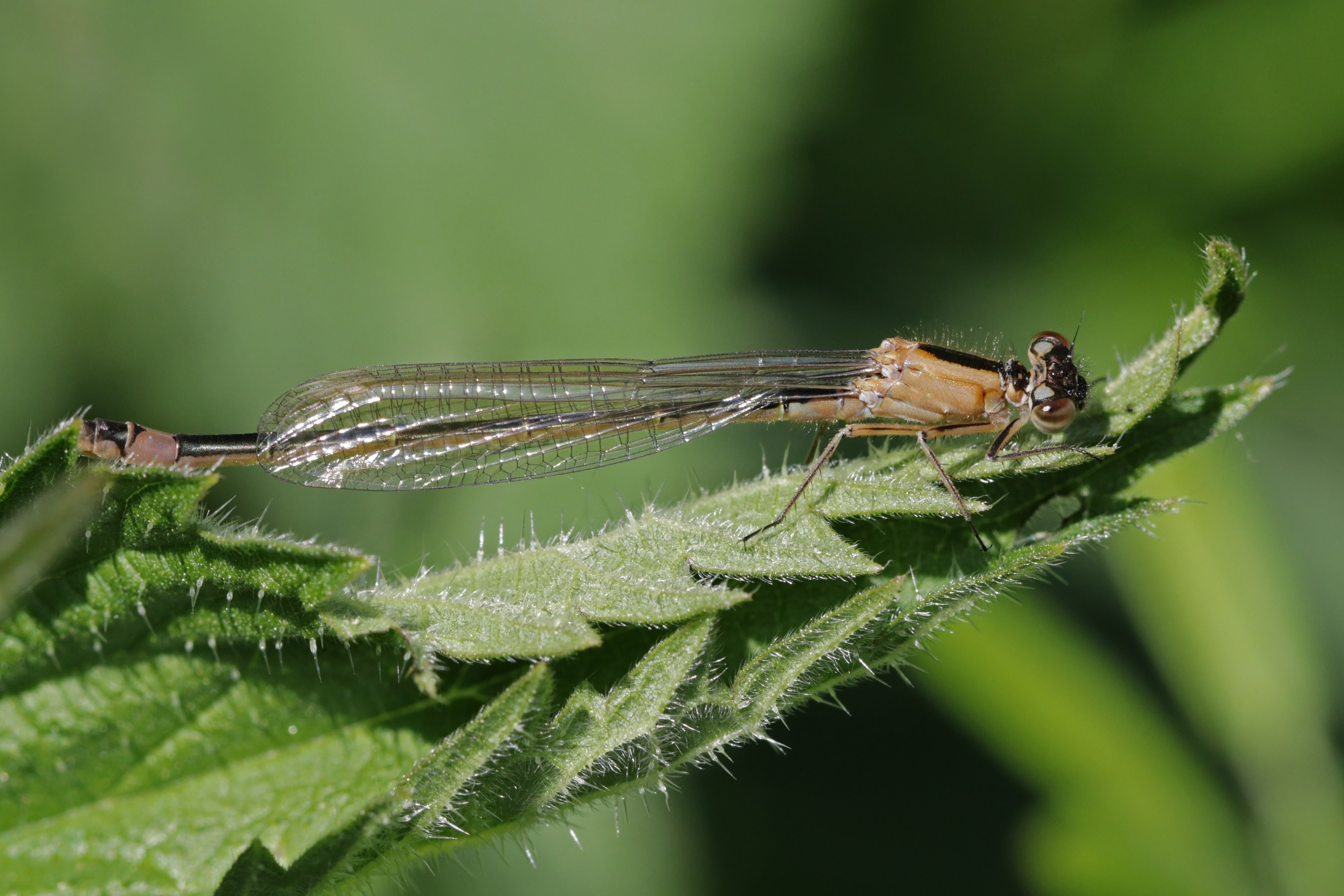
teneral female form rufescens

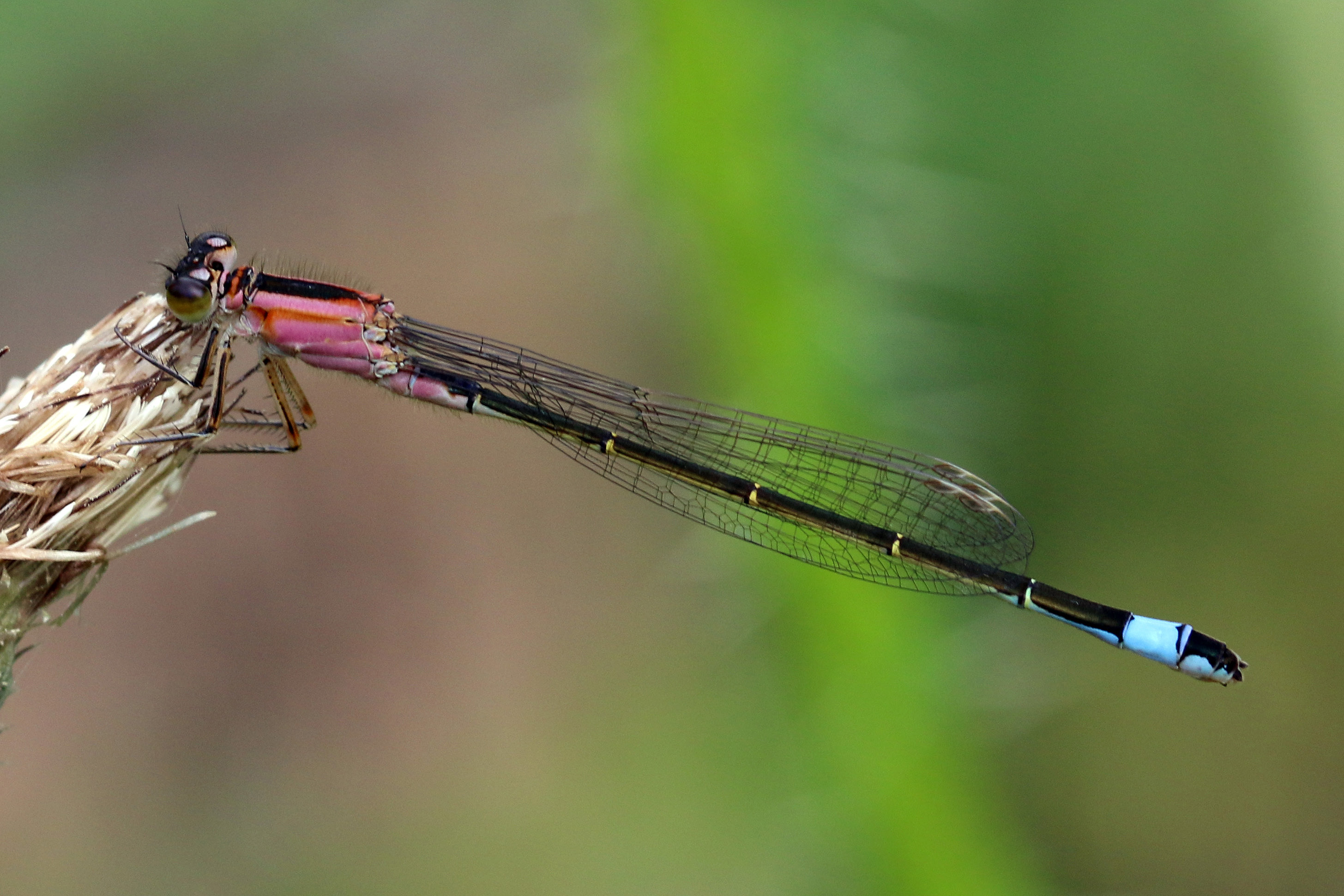
Female form rufescens

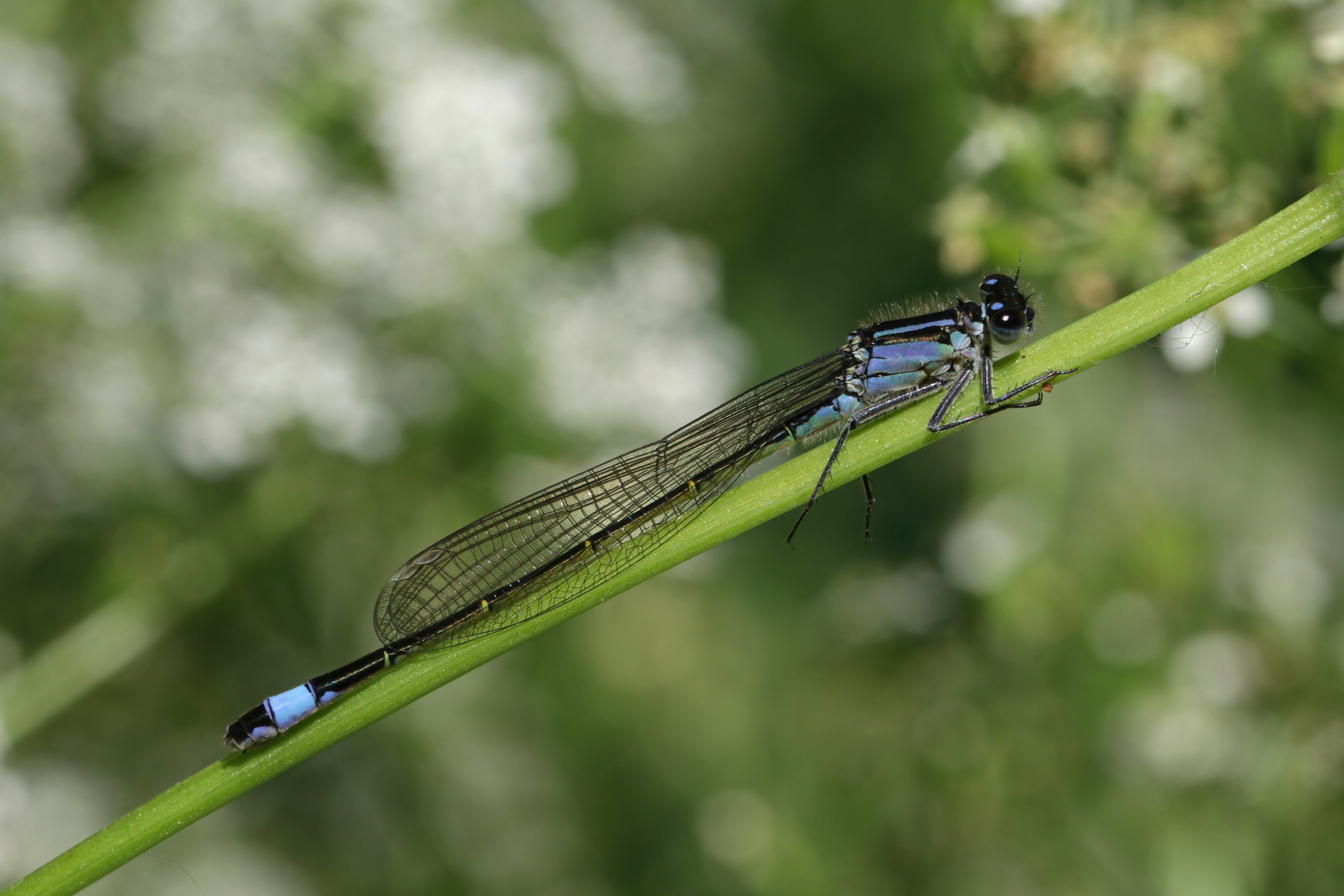
Female form violacea

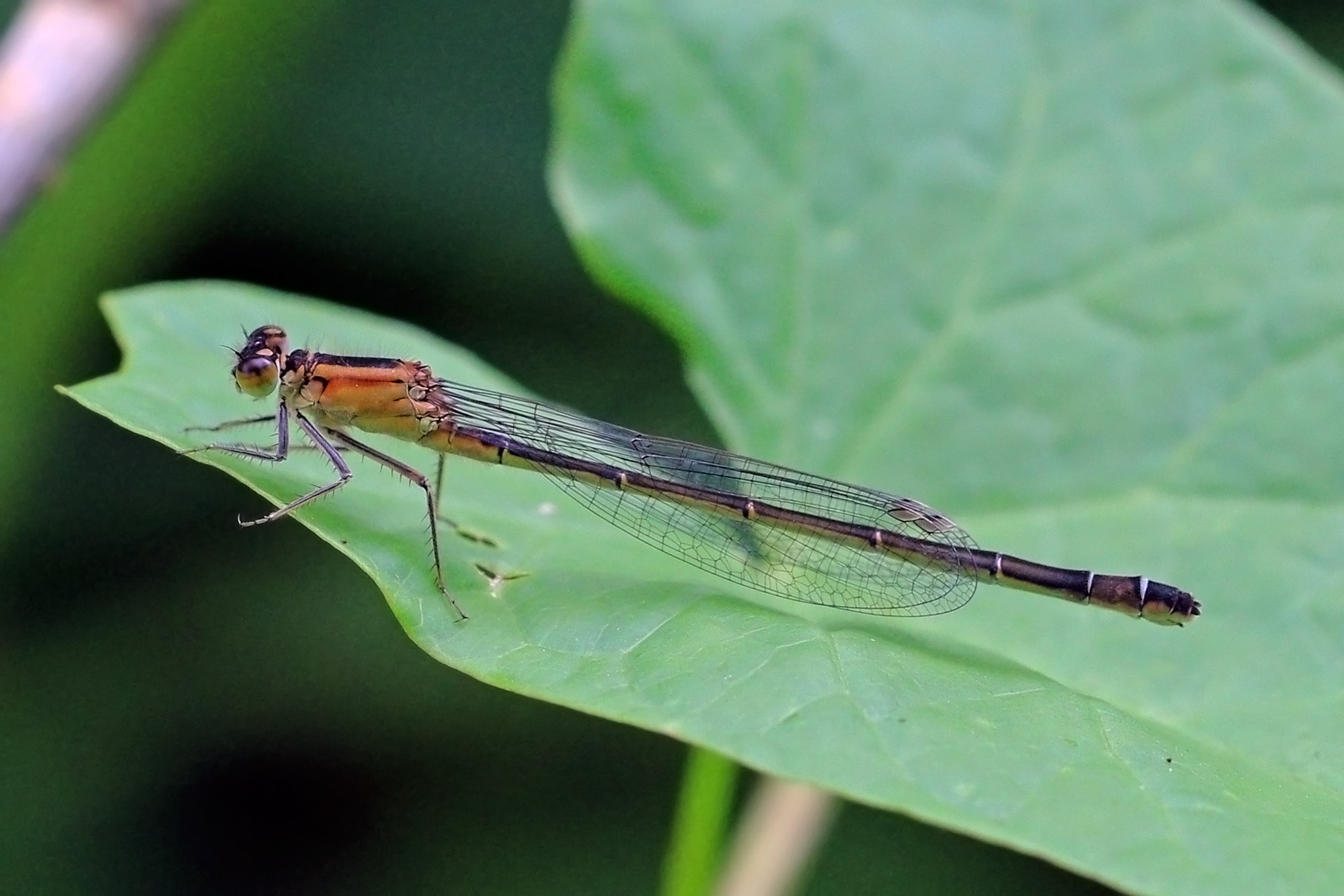
Female form rufescens-obsoleta
