= Wye with Hinxhill =

Civil parish in Kent, England

Coordinates: 51.1815°N 0.9413°E

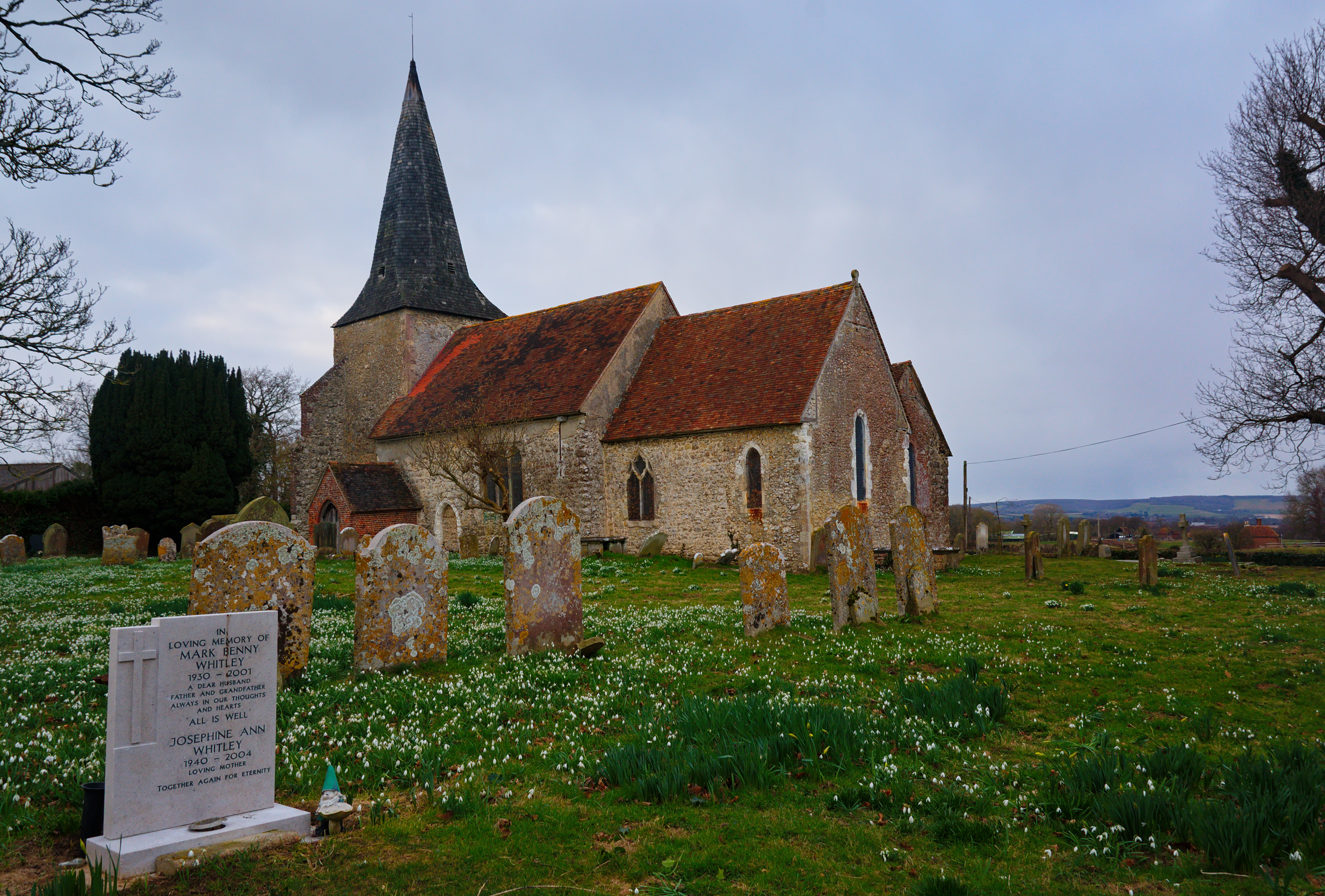
- St Mary's Church, Hinxhill

- Location within Kent
- Population: 2,384 (2001); 2,282 (2011)
- OS grid reference: TR055466
- Civil parish: Wye with Hinxhill
- District: Ashford
- Shire county: Kent
- Region: South East
- Country: England
- Sovereign state: United Kingdom
- Post town: ASHFORD
- Postcode district: TN25
- Dialling code: 01233
- Police: Kent
- Fire: Kent
- Ambulance: South East Coast
- UK Parliament: Ashford

Wye with Hinxhill is a hillside civil parish in the borough of Ashford northeast of Ashford, Kent itself, centred 3.7 miles (6.0 km) NNE of the town centre. The North Downs range of hills has a high escarpment on the east and west borders of the village, flanking a gap caused by the River Great Stour in the centre of the parish.

The combined village has a relatively low population and a large geographical area. The civil parish council meets monthly to administer local government resources, funding, and planning community events and facilities. It contains the main village of Wye and the much smaller Hinxhill and had a combined population of 2,300 in 2001. By the time of the 2011 Census, the population had reduced to 2,282.

== Transport ==
The A28 road passes through the parish from Ashford to Canterbury.

== Demography ==
Wye compared in the 2001 UK Census
	Wye	Ashford District	England
Population	2,405	102,661	49,138,831
Foreign born	14.6%	5.5%	9.2%
White	94.9%	97.6%	90.9%
Asian	1.8%	0.9%	4.6%
Black	1.2%	0.4%	2.3%
Christian	75.2%	76.5%	71.7%
Muslim	1.1%	0.6%	3.1%
Hindu	0.4%	0.3%	1.1%
No religion	15.3%	14.6%	14.6%
Unemployed	1.7%	2.4%	3.3%
Retired	16.8%	13.8%	13.5%

At the 2001 UK census (before the college closed), the Wye electoral ward had a population of 2,405. The ethnicity was 94.9% white, 1.5% mixed race, 1.8% Asian, 1.2% black and 0.6% other. The place of birth of residents was 85.4% United Kingdom, 1.1% Republic of Ireland, 4.5% other Western European countries, and 9% elsewhere. Religion was recorded as 75.2% Christian, 0.4% Buddhist, 0.4% Hindu, 0% Sikh and 0.2% Jewish, 1.1% Muslim. 15.3% were recorded as having no religion, 0.2% had an alternative religion and 7.2% did not state their religion.

The economic activity of residents aged 16–74 was 28.2% in full-time employment, 9.3% in part-time employment, 9.6% self-employed, 1.7% unemployed, 7.7% students with jobs, 16.6% students without jobs, 16.8% retired, 5.4% looking after home or family, 2.8% permanently sick or disabled and 2% economically inactive for other reasons. The industry of employment of residents was 12.8% retail, 9.3% manufacturing, 5.3% construction, 14.1% real estate, 9.9% health and social work, 17.7% education, 4.8% transport and communications, 5.5% public administration, 6.2% hotels and restaurants, 2.4% finance, 6.2% agriculture and 5.8% other. Compared with national figures, the ward had a relatively high proportion of workers in agriculture, education, hotels and restaurants. There were a relatively low proportion in manufacturing, construction, retail, finance, transport and communications. Of the ward's residents aged 16–74, 33.5% had a higher education qualification or the equivalent, compared with 19.9% nationwide.

== Recreation ==
Also following the valley, the Great Stour river and the Stour Valley Walk pass through the parish from Ashford to Canterbury. The river here is navigable to canoes and small boats.

== In popular culture ==
Author Russell Hoban repurposes Hinxhill as "Hagmans II" in his 1980, post apocalyptic novel Riddley Walker. Wye becomes "How".

== See also ==
- Listed buildings in Wye with Hinxhill
