= East Stour, Kent =

River in Kent, England

River East Stour
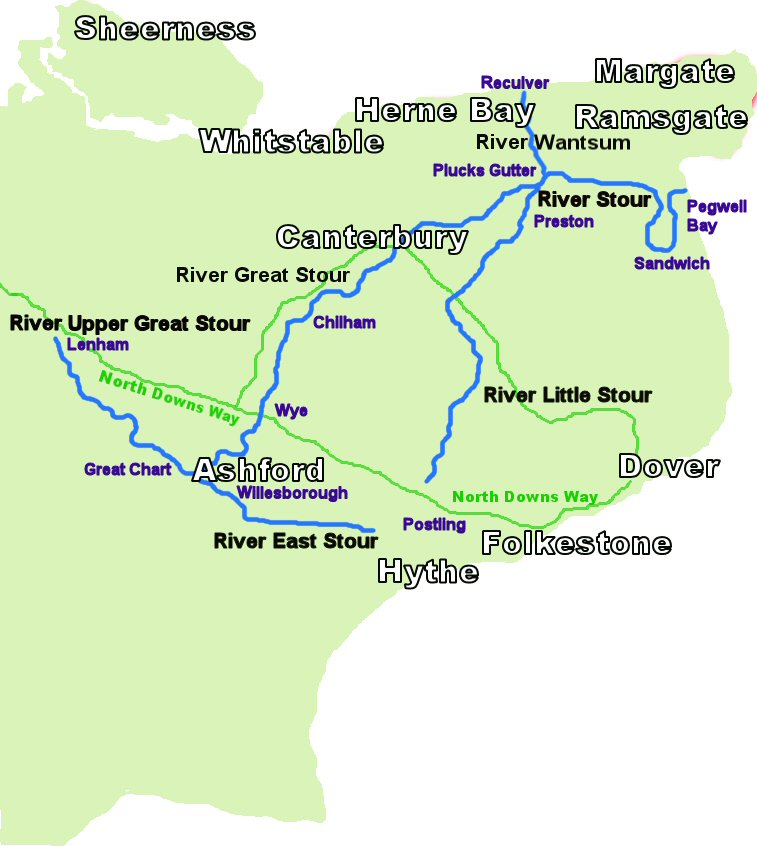
- River Stour and Tributaries

Physical characteristics
- Source
  - location: Postling
- Mouth
  - location: Great Stour; TR 01539 42793; Ashford
  - coordinates: 51°08′56″N 0°52′49″E
- Length: 10.3 mi (16.6 km)

The River East Stour is one of the tributaries of the Great Stour in Kent. The East Stour, 10.3 miles (16.5 km) long,) rises on the Greensand ridge at Postling north of Hythe as a number of small streams. It then flows under the M20 motorway to continue in a westward direction: the river meanders across the Low Weald plain, passing Mersham on the way. The East Stour's confluence with the Great Stour is on both sides of Pledge's Mill at the foot of East Hill, Ashford.

The South Willesborough Dykes are on the banks of the East Stour in Willesborough, Ashford and helps form part of the Ashford Green Corridor.
