= Ashford Borough Council elections =

Local government elections in Kent, England

Ashford Borough Council is the local authority for the Borough of Ashford in Kent, England. The council is elected every four years. Since the last boundary changes in 2019, 47 councillors have been elected from 39 wards.

== Political control ==
The first election to the council was held in 1973, initially operating as a shadow authority before coming into its powers on 1 April 1974. Political control of the council since 1973 has been held by the following parties:

Party in control	Years
No overall control	1973–1976
Conservative	1976–1979
No overall control	1979–1983
Conservative	1983–1995
No overall control	1995–2003
Conservative	2003–2022
No overall control	2022–present

=== Leadership ===
The leaders of the council since 1999 have been:

Councillor	Party	From	To
Paul Clokie	Conservative	1999	13 May 2010
Paul Bartlett	Conservative	13 May 2010	9 Nov 2010
Peter Wood	Conservative	9 Nov 2010	1 Mar 2013
Gerry Clarkson	Conservative	18 Apr 2013	7 May 2023
Noel Ovenden	Ashford Ind.	30 May 2023	

== Seat composition ==
Year	Conservative	Labour	Liberal Democrats (Note: Includes totals for the predecessors of the Liberal Democrats, the Liberal Party and SDP (both of which participated in the Alliance).)	Ashford Ind.	Green	UKIP	Independents & Others	Council control after election
Local government reorganisation; council established (44 seats)
1973	22	8	10	–	–	–	4	No overall control
New ward boundaries (49 seats)
1976	31	7	3	–	0	–	8	Conservative
1979	24	10	6	–	0	–	9	No overall control
1983	26	6	8	–	0	–	9	Conservative
1987	31	6	10	–	0	–	2	Conservative
1991	29	7	11	–	0	–	2	Conservative
1995	18	13	15	–	0	0	3	No overall control
1999	24	11	10	–	0	0	4	No overall control
New ward boundaries (43 seats)
2003	25	4	5	9	0	0	0	Conservative
2007	28	2	8	4	0	0	1	Conservative
2011	30	5	2	5	0	0	1	Conservative
2015	34	4	1	2	0	1	1	Conservative
New ward boundaries (47 seats)
2019	26	7	0	11	2	0	1	Conservative
2023	19	11	0	9	8	0	0	No overall control

== Borough result maps ==
2003 results map

2007 results map

2011 results map

2015 result map

2019 results map

2023 results map

== By-election results ==
=== 1995-1999 ===
Tenterden East By-Election 11 December 1997
Party	Candidate	Votes	%	±%
Conservative		387	58.9	−3.7
Liberal Democrats		147	22.4	−15.0
Labour		123	18.7	+18.7
Majority		240	36.5	
Turnout		657		
Conservative hold		Swing		

=== 2003-2007 ===
Charing By-Election 16 February 2006
Party	Candidate	Votes	%	±%
Conservative	Gerald Clarkson	419	71.7	+4.3
Liberal Democrats	Jonathan Heuch	126	21.6	−11.0
Labour	Malcolm Horton	39	6.7	+6.7
Majority		293	50.1	
Turnout		584	30.1	
Conservative hold		Swing		

=== 2011-2015 ===
Beaver by-election 24 November 2011
Party	Candidate	Votes	%	±%
Conservative	Cengizhan Cerit	249	27.69	
Liberal Democrats	Jack Cowen	173	19.24	
Ashford Ind.	Laura Lawrence	111	12.34	
Green	Mark Reed	26	2.89	
Labour	Rebecca Rutter	336	37.37	
Majority		87	9.67	
Turnout		899	20.5	−13.25
Labour hold				

Tenterden South by-election 12 July 2012
Party	Candidate	Votes	%	±%
Labour	Dara Farrell	36	5.92	+5.92
Conservative	Jill Hutchinson	277	45.55	−12.28
Ashford Ind.	Roy Isworth	179	29.44	−11.02
UKIP	Thomas Taylor	72	11.84	+11.84
Liberal Democrats	Christopher Took	40	6.57	+6.57
Majority		98	16.11	−1.26
Turnout		608	31.13	−17.48
Conservative hold				

Beaver by-election 28 February 2013
Party	Candidate	Votes	%	±%
Labour	Jill Britcher	296	35.83	−1.54
Liberal Democrats	Jack Cowen	79	9.56	−9.68
Independent	John Holland	34	4.11	+4.11
Ashford Ind.	Palma Laughton	85	10.29	−2.05
Conservative	Jane Martin	158	19.12	−8.57
Green	Mark Reed	19	2.3	−0.59
UKIP	Angharad Yeo	155	18.76	+18.76
Majority		138	16.7	+7.03
Turnout		826	19.4	−1.1
Labour hold				

Saxon Shore by-election 2 May 2013
Party	Candidate	Votes	%	±%
UKIP	Christopher Cooper	410	27.66	
Conservative	Jane Martin	759	51.21	
Green	Geoffrey Meaden	129	8.7	
Labour	Thomas Reed	174	11.74	
Majority		349	23.54	
Turnout		1482	35.67	−16.98
Conservative hold				

Wye by-election 6 March 2014
Party	Candidate	Votes	%	±%
Liberal Democrats	Ken Blanshard	13	1.73	−7.07
Conservative	Ian Cooling	240	31.95	−6.82
UKIP	Elaine Evans	97	12.91	+3.32
Labour	Dylan Jones	22	2.92	−8.15
Green	Geoffrey Meaden	55	7.32	+7.32
Ashford Ind.	Noel Ovenden	323	43	+4.23
Majority		83	11.05	
Turnout		751	41	−14.46
Ashford Ind. gain from Conservative		Swing		

The 2014 Wye by-election was triggered by the resignation of Councillor Steve Wright.

=== 2015-2019 ===
Aylesford Green by-election 19 November 2015
Party	Candidate	Votes	%	±%
Liberal Democrats	Adrian Gee-Turner	42	8.91	+8.91
Conservative	Alexander Howard	110	23.35	−20.27
Ashford Ind.	Christine Kathawick-Smith	92	19.53	+19.53
Labour	Gordon Miller	106	22.5	−30.92
Green	Thom Pizzey	10	2.12	+2.12
UKIP	Harriet Yeo	109	23.14	+23.14
Majority		1	0.21	
Turnout		471	19.01	−34.67
Conservative gain from Labour		Swing		

Beaver by-election 4 August 2016
Party	Candidate	Votes	%	±%
UKIP	Ryan Macpherson	373	42.1	+11.6
Labour	Caroline Harris	243	27.4	−3.3
Conservative	Jo Gideon	240	27.1	+0.2
Green	Liz Wright	31	3.5	−3.8
Majority		130	14.7	
Turnout		890	21.3	−34.64
UKIP gain from Labour		Swing		

The 2016 Beaver by-election was triggered by the resignation of Councillor Jill Britcher.

Victoria by-election 8 June 2017
Party	Candidate	Votes	%	±%
Liberal Democrats	James Galloway	260	11.04	
UKIP	Serge Goldenberg-Kosbab	181	7.68	
Green	Maria Pizzey	99	4.2	
Conservative	David Robey	753	31.98	
Labour	John Charles Suddards	1052	44.68	
Majority		299	12.7	
Turnout		2354	56.81	−0.29
Labour gain from Conservative		Swing		

Bockhanger by-election 8 June 2017
Party	Candidate	Votes	%	±%
Labour	Euan Anckorn	415	31.27	−1.2
Green	Steve Campkin	97	7.3	+7.3
Conservative	Simon Howard-Smith	697	52.52	+12
UKIP	Liah Macpherson	113	8.51	+8.51
Majority		282	21.25	+10.7
Turnout		1327	64.07	+1.92
Conservative hold		Swing		

Kennington by-election 25 October 2018
Party	Candidate	Votes	%	±%
Ashford Ind.	Ian McAllister Anderson	227	38.02	+23.1
Conservative	Nathan Iliffe	247	41.37	−6.6
Labour	Dylan Jones	85	14.23	+6
Green	Peter Morgan	36	6	+6
Majority		20	3.35	
Turnout		597	32.8	−43.25
Conservative hold		Swing		

The 2018 Kennington by-election was triggered by the resignation of Councillor Phil Sims.

=== 2019-2023 ===
Downs North by-election 18 July 2019
Party	Candidate	Votes	%	±%
Ashford Ind.	Rachael Carley	67	10.38	+10.38
Conservative	Charles Dehnel	229	35.5	−11.9
Liberal Democrats	Adrian Gee-Turner	70	10.85	−7.8
Green	Geoffery Meaden	190	29.45	+5.9
UKIP	Philip Meads	22	3.41	+3.41
Labour	Carly Ruppert Lingham	17	2.63	−7.7
Independent	Sarah Williams	49	7.59	+7.59
Majority		39	6	
Turnout		645	32.52	−3.1
Conservative hold		Swing		

The 2019 Downs North by-election was triggered by the death of Councillor Stephen Dehnel.

Park Farm North by-election 12 March 2020
Party	Candidate	Votes	%	±%
Ashford Ind.	Trish Cornish	247	60.2	+60.2
Labour	Garry Harrison	29	7	−12.9
Conservative	Aline Hicks	115	28	−33.5
Green	Thom Pizzey	11	2.6	+2.6
Liberal Democrats	Samuel Strolz	8	1.9	−16.7
Majority		132	32.1	
Turnout		410	22.05	−5.2
Ashford Ind. gain from Conservative		Swing		

The 2020 Park Farm North by-election was triggered by the election of Councillor Jo Gideon to the UK Parliament as MP for Stoke-on-Trent Central.

Beaver by-election 6 May 2021
Party	Candidate	Votes	%	±%
Conservative	Trevor Brooks	469	41.9	
Independent	Garry Harrison	105	9.4	
Labour	Dylan Jones	402	36	
Green	Thom Pizzey	70	6.2	
Liberal Democrats	Jacqueline Stamp	64	5.7	
Majority		66	5.9	
Turnout		1115	23.47	−0.6
Conservative gain from Labour		Swing		

The 2021 Beaver by-election was triggered by the death of Councillor Alex Ward.

Downs North by-election 19 August 2021
Party	Candidate	Votes	%	±%
Green	Geoffery Meaden	273	51.8	+20.8
Liberal Democrats	Carol Wilcox	15	2.8	−8.6
Conservative	Sarah Williams	239	45.5	+7.9
Majority		34	6.4	
Turnout		529	25.96	−5.6
Green gain from Conservative		Swing		

The 2021 Downs North by-election was triggered by the resignation of Councillor Charles Dehnel.

Highfield by-election 16 December 2021
Party	Candidate	Votes	%	±%
Ashford Ind.	Barry Ball	101	21.1	−7
Green	Dawnie Nilsson	191	39.9	+21.5
Labour	Terry Pavlou	23	4.8	+4.8
Conservative	James Ransley	163	34.1	−6.5
Majority		28	5.8%	
Turnout		478	23.66	−11.39
Green gain from Conservative		Swing		

The 2021 Highfield by-election was triggered by the death of Councillor Gerald White.

=== 2023-2027 ===
Aylesford & East Stour by-election 17 October 2024
Party	Candidate	Votes	%	±%
Green	Thom Pizzey	299	31.6	+2.8
Labour	Rena Mathew	293	31.0	−1.2
Reform	Brian Collins	216	22.9	
Conservative	Jac Wood	111	11.7	−2.2
Liberal Democrats	Alexander Coxall	26	2.8	
Majority		6	0.6	
Turnout		945	21	
Green gain from Labour		Swing		

The 2024 Aylesford & East Stour by-election was triggered by the resignation of Councillor Sojan Joseph following their election as MP for Ashford.

Rolvenden & Tenterden West by-election: 25 September 2025
Party	Candidate	Votes	%	±%
Green	Guy Pullen	262	36.5	–16.9
Reform	Tony Trilsbach	227	31.6	N/A
Conservative	George Davis	200	27.9	–10.3
Liberal Democrats	Chris Grayling	19	2.6	N/A
Labour	Ava Charlton	10	1.4	–7.0
Majority		35	4.9	
Turnout		716	36.1	
Registered electors		1,987		
Green hold		Swing		
