= 2013 Kent County Council election =

2013 UK local government election

← 2009	2 May 2013	2017 →

All 84 seats to Kent County Council 43 seats needed for a majority
	First party	Second party
Party	Conservative	UKIP
Seats won	45	17
Seat change	▼27	▲16
	Third party	Fourth party
Party	Labour	Liberal Democrats
Seats won	13	7
Seat change	▲10	0
- Map showing the results of the 2013 Kent County Council elections.
Council control before election
Conservative
Council control after election
Conservative

The Kent County Council election, 2013 was an election to all 84 seats on Kent County Council held on Thursday 2 May as part of the 2013 United Kingdom local elections. 84 councillors were elected from 72 electoral divisions, which returned either one or two county councillors each by first-past-the-post voting for a four-year term of office. The electoral divisions were the same as those used at the previous election in 2009. No elections were held in Medway, which is a unitary authority outside the area covered by the County Council. The election saw the Conservative Party narrowly retain overall control of the council.

All locally registered electors (British, Irish, Commonwealth and European Union citizens) who were aged 18 or over on Thursday 2 May 2013 were entitled to vote in the local elections. Those who were temporarily away from their ordinary address (for example, away working, on holiday, in student accommodation or in hospital) were also entitled to vote in the local elections, although those who had moved abroad and registered as overseas electors cannot vote in the local elections. It is possible to register to vote at more than one address (such as a university student who had a term-time address and lives at home during holidays) at the discretion of the local Electoral Register Office, but it remains an offence to vote more than once in the same local government election.

== Summary ==
The Conservative Party retained overall control of the council, winning 44 of the 84 seats on the council. This was a reduction of 30 seats from the party's 2009 performance, where the local party held all but 10 of the 84 seats.

UKIP came second with 17 seats (including one defection from the Conservatives prior to the election), becoming the official opposition with Roger Latchford as their leader. UKIP capitalised on their strong national popularity and Parliamentary by-election results, winning their first representation on the council. Labour Party candidates made substantial gains, rising from 3 to 13 seats and finishing in third place in the election. Despite local Liberal Democrats winning the same number of seats as in 2009, they are no longer the official opposition, having slipped to become the fourth-largest party in the Maidstone County Hall chamber.

The Green Party won their first seat on the council, for the Hythe division.

The Swanscombe and Greenhithe division was held by the incumbent independent councillor, who gained the seat in 2009.

== Results ==
Kent County Council election, 2013
Party	Seats	Gains	Losses	Net gain/loss	Seats %	Votes %	Votes	+/−
Conservative	45	0	27	-27	52.38	35.47	141,192	
UKIP	17	16	0	+16	20.24	25.83	102,813	
Labour	13	11	1	+10	15.48	22.59	89,935	
Liberal Democrats	7	1	1	0	8.33	9.35	37,214	
Green	1	1	0	+1	1.19	3.65	14,531	
Swanscombe and Greenhithe Residents Association	1	0	0	0	1.19	0.17	673	
Independent	0	0	0	0	0.00	1.24	4,929	
English Democrat	0	0	0	0	0.00	0.87	3,465	
No Description	0	0	0	0	0.00	0.45	1,780	
TUSC	0	0	0	0	0.00	0.11	439	
New England	0	0	0	0	0.00	0.08	312	
Ashford Ind.	0	0	0	0	0.00	0.07	281	
Monster Raving Loony	0	0	0	0	0.00	0.05	215	

== Council composition ==
Prior to the election the composition of the council was:

↓
74	7	2	1
Conservative	LD	Lab	R

After the election the composition of the council was:

↓
45	17	13	7	1	1
Conservative	UKIP	Labour	LD	G	R

LD - Liberal Democrats
G - Green Party
R - Residents Association

== Results by district ==
Kent is divided into 12 regions: Ashford, Canterbury, Dartford, Dover, Gravesham, Maidstone, Sevenoaks, Folkestone and Hythe, Swale, Thanet, Tonbridge and Malling, and Tunbridge Wells.

=== Ashford ===
There are seven single-member constituencies within the borough of Ashford. Below are the results:

Ashford Central
Party	Candidate	Votes	%	±%
Conservative	Jim Wedgbury	1,170	37	−17
UKIP	Norman Taylor	913	29	N/A
Labour	Dara Farrell	532	17	+4
Green	Steven Robert Campkin	273	9	−6
Liberal Democrats	Chris Took	238	8	−10
Majority		257	8	
Turnout		3,126	26	−7
Conservative hold		Swing		

Ashford East
Party	Candidate	Votes	%	±%
Liberal Democrats	Georgie Joseph Serge Koowaree	972	28	−28
UKIP	Elaine Evans	827	24	N/A
Conservative	Richard Bunting	787	23	−11
Labour	Harriet Bronwen Yeo	444	13	+3
Ashford Ind.	Tony Bartlett	295	9	N/A
Green	Mandy Rossi	143	4	N/A
Majority		145	4	
Turnout		3,468	27	−8
Liberal Democrats hold		Swing		

Ashford Rural East
Party	Candidate	Votes	%	±%
Conservative	Andrew Wickham	1,741	44	−14
UKIP	Eddy Barrows	995	25	N/A
Labour	Tom Reed	421	11	+4
Green	Geoff Meaden	333	8	−10
Liberal Democrats	Ken Blanshard	241	6	−11
Independent	Jack Woodford	226	6	N/A
Majority		746	19	
Turnout		3,957	33	−9
Conservative hold		Swing		

Ashford Rural South
Party	Candidate	Votes	%	±%
Conservative	Mike Angell	1,378	41	−16
UKIP	Ann Taylor	1,095	32	N/A
Labour	Vivien Wheatley	482	14	+5
Green	Marilyn Sansom	195	6	−8
Liberal Democrats	John Bullivant Mackie	175	5	−15
BNP	Michael Barry Hook	48	1	N/A
Majority		283	9	
Turnout		3,373	25	−12
Conservative hold		Swing		

Ashford Rural West
Party	Candidate	Votes	%	±%
Conservative	Charlie Simkins	1,872	44	−21
UKIP	Pat Purnell	1,367	32	N/A
Labour	Waheed Qureshi	371	9	+2
Green	Hilary Jones	328	8	−6
Liberal Democrats	Clare Hardwick	326	8	−6
Majority		505	12	
Turnout		4,264	28	−13
Conservative hold		Swing		

Ashford South
Party	Candidate	Votes	%	±%
Labour	Derek Smyth	1,026	37	+11
UKIP	Victoria Angharad Frances Yeo	827	30	N/A
Conservative	Larry Krause	486	18	−16
Liberal Democrats	Adrian John Gee-Turner	290	11	−10
Green	Tom Phillip Harry Medhurst	118	4	−3
Majority		299	7	
Turnout		2,747	23	−8
Labour gain from Conservative		Swing		

Tenterden
Party	Candidate	Votes	%	±%
Conservative	Mike Hill	2,074	51	−19
UKIP	Robert Charles Dobson	1,211	30	N/A
Labour	Alex Ward	308	8	±0
Green	Matt Stanley	292	7	N/A
Liberal Democrats	Stuart James Dove	196	5	−17
Majority		863	21	
Turnout		4,081	34	−8
Conservative hold		Swing		

=== Canterbury ===
There are five single-member and two multi-member constituencies within the City of Canterbury, which elect a total of nine councilors to Kent County Council. Below are the results:

Canterbury City North East
Party	Candidate	Votes	%	±%
Conservative	Graham Kenneth Gibbens	1,207	43	−2
Labour	Mike Bland	768	27	+17
UKIP	Jim Gascoyne	384	14	N/A
Liberal Democrats	Martin Ashton	234	8	−25
Green	Russell John Charles Page	213	8%	−4
Majority		439	16	
Turnout		2,806	24	−13
Conservative hold		Swing		

Canterbury City South West
Party	Candidate	Votes	%	±%
Liberal Democrats	Martin Vye	1,555	43	−6
Conservative	Jeremy Paul Bellamy	563	15	−12
UKIP	David Kenneth Charles Perry	562	15	N/A
Labour	Howard Robert Rowles	526	15	+6
Green	Jo Kidd	439	12	−3
Majority		992	28	
Turnout		3,648	29	−9
Liberal Democrats hold		Swing		

Canterbury South East
Party	Candidate	Votes	%	±%
Conservative	Michael John Northey	1,385	33	−13
Liberal Democrats	Michael John Sole	1,181	28	−6
UKIP	Oliver John Kent	795	19	N/A
Labour	Jean Elizabeth Butcher	549	13	+6
Green	Emily Edith Shirley	294	7	−6
Majority		204	5	
Turnout		4,204	31	−13
Conservative hold		Swing		

Canterbury West
Party	Candidate	Votes	%	±%
Conservative	John David Simmonds	1,067	38	−12
UKIP	David Joseph De Boick	633	22	N/A
Labour	Carol Goldstein	496	18	+9
Liberal Democrats	Dan Smith	383	14	−9
Green	Steel James Horton	236	8	−10
Majority		434	16	
Turnout		2,815	23	−13
Conservative hold		Swing		

Herne and Sturry
Party	Candidate	Votes	%	±%
Conservative	Alan Marsh	1,452	41	−6
UKIP	Sarah Larkins	1,086	31	+7
Labour	Alan Stanley Holden	590	17	+6
Green	Elisa Anne De Vert	217	6	N/A
Liberal Democrats	Nigel Philip Whitburn	169	5	−13
Majority		366	10	
Turnout		3,514	27	−8
Conservative hold		Swing		

Herne Bay (2 Seats)
Party	Candidate	Votes	%	±%
UKIP	Brian Eric MacDowall	2,054	17	+8
UKIP	Nicholas James Bond	2,048	17	N/A
Conservative	Jean Law	1,817	15	−4
Conservative	David Alan Hirst	1,724	14	−5
Labour	Lynn Faux-Bowyer	1,003	8	+4
Labour	Tom Mellish	948	8	+5
Independent	Steve Coombes	509	4	N/A
Independent	John David Moore	484	4	N/A
Liberal Democrats	Margaret Grace Flaherty	434	3	−12
Independent	Stanley Truelove	362	3	N/A
Liberal Democrats	June Rose Raybaud	308	2	−10
Green	Elaine Margaret Godden	242	2	−2
Green	Michael Peter Coppin	202	2	N/A
New England	Mike Tibby	193	2	N/A
New England	Nathan King	119	1	N/A
Majority		231	2	
Turnout		12,409	28	−8
UKIP gain from Conservative		Swing		
UKIP gain from Conservative		Swing		

Whitstable (2 Seats)
Party	Candidate	Votes	%	±%
Conservative	Mark Charles Dance	2,732	17	−9
Conservative	Mike Harrison	2,666	17	−8
UKIP	Mike Bull	2,476	16	N/A
UKIP	Howard Malcolm Farmer	2,435	15	N/A
Labour	James Christopher Cornell	1,813	11	+4
Labour	Rita O' Brien	1,781	11	+4
Green	Jolyon Loch Trimingham	600	4	−7
Green	Pat Marsh	566	4	N/A
Liberal Democrats	Jonathan Dearth	529	3	−8
Liberal Democrats	Kevin Michael Peter McNamara	344	2	−8
Majority		190	1	
Turnout		15,942	32	−8
Conservative hold		Swing		
Conservative hold		Swing		

=== Dartford ===
There are six single-member constituencies within the borough of Dartford. Below are the results:

Dartford East
Party	Candidate	Votes	%	±%
Conservative	Penny Cole	942	37	−1
Labour	Patrick Kelly	885	35	+9
UKIP	Ivan Paul Burch	628	25	N/A
English Democrat	Teresa Cannon	99	4	−20
Majority		57	2	
Turnout		2554	26	−8
Conservative hold		Swing		

Dartford North East
Party	Candidate	Votes	%	±%
Labour Co-op	Tom Maddison	1,267	42	+13
Conservative	Avtar Sandhu	1,088	36	+6
UKIP	Shan-E-Din Choycha	552	18	N/A
BNP	Ronald David Ball	111	4	+5
Majority		179	6	
Turnout		3,018	26	−8
Labour Co-op gain from Conservative		Swing		

Dartford Rural
Party	Candidate	Votes	%	±%
Conservative	Jeremy Allan Kite, MBE	2,067	53	−3
UKIP	Karl Smith	990	26	N/A
Labour	David John Baker	688	18	+6
English Democrat	Steve Culliford	136	4	−16
Majority		1077	27	
Turnout		3,881	31	−9
Conservative hold		Swing		

Dartford West
Party	Candidate	Votes	%	±%
Conservative	Jan Ozog	1,560	41	−8
UKIP	Jo Shippam	1,112	29	N/A
Labour	John Patrick Burden	1,095	28	N/A
English Democrat	Milly Uncles	84	2	+31
Majority		448	12	
Turnout		3,851	29	−10
Conservative hold		Swing		

Swanscombe and Greenhithe
Party	Candidate	Votes	%	±%
Swanscombe and Greenhithe Residents Association	Peter Martin Harman	673	27	−10
Conservative	Keith Martin Kelly	650	26	0
Labour Co-op	Val Ashenden	567	23	+11
UKIP	Stephen Wilders	528	21	N/A
BNP	Michael Godfrey Cope	49	2	−9
English Democrat	Charlie Wood	42	2	−6
Majority		23	1	
Turnout		2,509	21	−9
Residents hold		Swing		

Wilmington
Party	Candidate	Votes	%	±%
Conservative	Ann Allen	1,790	49	−7
UKIP	Gary Paul Rogers	891	24	N/A
Labour	Mark Andrew Maddison	862	23	+4
English Democrat	Di Settle	128	3	−22
Majority		899	25	
Turnout		3,671	28	−11
Conservative hold		Swing		

=== Dover ===
There are three single-member and two multi-member constituencies within the District of Dover, which elect a total of seven councillors to Kent County Council. Below are the results:

Deal (2 Seats)
Party	Candidate	Votes	%	±%
Labour	Mick Eddy	2,983	21	+8
Labour	Eileen Rowbotham	2,881	20	+6
Conservative	Trevor Antony Bond	2,670	19	−3
Conservative	Adrian Friend	2,564	18	−3
UKIP	Peter Ripley	2,081	15	N/A
Liberal Democrats	Robin Charles Hook	587	4	−11
Liberal Democrats	Sarah Smith	465	3	−11
Majority		211	1	
Turnout		14,231	34	−7
Labour hold		Swing		
Labour hold		Swing		

Dover North
Party	Candidate	Votes	%	±%
Conservative	Steve Manion	2,034	45	+2
Labour	Linda Anne Keen	1,630	36	+12
Independent	Paul McMullan	579	13	N/A
Liberal Democrats	Linda Anne Hook	309	7	−7
Majority		404	9	
Turnout		4,552	36	−8
Conservative hold		Swing		

Dover Town (2 Seats)
Party	Candidate	Votes	%	±%
Labour	Pam Brivio	2,353	23	+8
Labour	Gordon Cowan	2,195	21	+7
UKIP	Peter John Myers	1,850	18	N/A
	Nigel Collor	1,666	16	N/A
Conservative	Pauline Margaret Beresford	1,622	16	−7
Liberal Democrats	Janet Anita Florence Hilton	334	3	−11
Liberal Democrats	Clive John Meredith	313	3	−11
Majority		345	3	
Turnout		10,333	27	−5
Labour gain from Conservative		Swing		
Labour gain from Conservative		Swing		

Dover West
Party	Candidate	Votes	%	±%
Conservative	Geoff Lymer	1,778	38	−7
UKIP	John Gordon Killip	1,653	36	+11
Labour	Mick Smith	855	18	+6
Liberal Democrats	Peter Alexander Lodge	237	5	−13
	Vic Matcham	114	2	N/A
Majority		125	2	
Turnout		4,637	35	−7
Conservative hold		Swing		

Sandwich
Party	Candidate	Votes	%	±%
Conservative	Leyland Bradshaw Ridings, MBE	2,093	45	−12
UKIP	Mark Stubbings	1,173	25	N/A
Labour	David Pestell	983	21	+7
Liberal Democrats	Russell James Timpson	381	8	−21
Majority		920	20	
Turnout		4,630	34	−6
Conservative hold		Swing		

=== Gravesham ===
There is a single-member and two multi-member constituencies within the Borough of Gravesham, which elect a total of five councillors to Kent County Council. Below are the results:

Gravesham East (2 Seats)
Party	Candidate	Votes	%	±%
Labour	Colin William Caller	3,659	23	+10
Labour	Jane Cribbon	3,581	22	+8
Conservative	John Martin Cubitt	2,786	17	−5
UKIP	David Shaun Beattie	2,342	15	N/A
Conservative	Samir Jassal	2,250	14	−6
English Democrat	Jason Andrew Mee	663	4	−4
Liberal Democrats	Martin James Wilson	380	2	−4
TUSC	Chas Berry	256	2	N/A
Majority		795	5	
Turnout		15,926	29	−5
Labour hold		Swing		
Labour hold		Swing		

Gravesham Rural
Party	Candidate	Votes	%	±%
Conservative	Bryan John Sweetland	3,213	63	+3
Labour	Douglas Campbell Christie	954	19	+9
English Democrat	Steven Charles Clegg	922	18	+7
Majority		2259	44	
Turnout		5089	31	−12
Conservative hold		Swing		

Northfleet and Gravesend West (2 Seats)
Party	Candidate	Votes	%	±%
Labour	Narinderjit Singh Thandi	3,884	28	+9
Labour	Sue Howes	3,471	25	+7
UKIP	Michael Glyn Dixon	2,104	15	N/A
Conservative	Harold John Craske	2,041	15	−4
Conservative	Alan Michael Ridgers	1,710	12	−4
English Democrat	Stephen Francis-Weatherall	748	5	−2
Majority		1367	10	
Turnout		13,958	27	−8
Labour gain from Conservative		Swing		
Labour hold		Swing		

=== Maidstone ===
There are seven single-member and one multi-member constituencies within the Borough of Maidstone, which elect a total of nine councillors to Kent County Council. Below are the results:

Maidstone Central (2 Seats)
Party	Candidate	Votes	%	±%
Liberal Democrats	Dan Daley	3,087	20	−6
Liberal Democrats	Rob Bird	2,730	18	−4
UKIP	Simon Peter John Parry	1,635	11	+4
Conservative	Paul Francis Butcher	1,604	11	−3
Conservative	David Christopher Burton	1,471	10	−4
UKIP	James Samuel Rosier	1,385	9	N/A
Labour	Paul Harper	1,112	7	+4
Labour	Marianna Romeojuliet Poliszczuk	839	6	+3
Green	Stuart Robert Jeffery	645	4	−2
Green	Wendy Kathleen Lewis	486	3	−1
English Democrat	Geoffrey Leonard Porter	115	1	N/A
Turnout		15,109	28	−4
Liberal Democrats hold		Swing		
Liberal Democrats hold		Swing		

Maidstone North East
Party	Candidate	Votes	%	±%
Liberal Democrats	Ian Stephen Chittenden	1,542	42	−11
UKIP	Charles Richard Elliott	894	24	+9
Conservative	Annabelle Jane Blackmore	740	20	−6
Labour	Keith Adkinson	327	9	N/A
Green	Andrew Crawford Waldie	180	5	−1
English Democrat	Matthew James Godden	25	1	N/A
Majority		648	18	
Turnout		3,708	29	−7
Liberal Democrats hold		Swing		

Maidstone Rural East
Party	Candidate	Votes	%	±%
Conservative	Jenny Whittle	2,780	69	−5
Labour	Jim Grogan	555	14	+5
Green	Penny Kemp	453	11	N/A
Liberal Democrats	Geoffrey Richard Samme	213	5	−12
Majority		2,225	55	
Turnout		4,001	30	−12
Conservative hold		Swing		

Maidstone Rural North
Party	Candidate	Votes	%	±%
Conservative	Paul Carter	1,915	46	−12
UKIP	Terence Morris Turner	1,291	31	+16
Labour	Mick Beckwith	473	11	+4
Liberal Democrats	Brian Richard Edwin Mortimer	298	7	−4
Green	Ciaran Dominic Oliver	217	5	−2
Majority		624	13	
Turnout		4,194	29	−9
Conservative hold		Swing		

Maidstone Rural South
Party	Candidate	Votes	%	±%
Conservative	Eric Hotson	1,884	58	−4
Green	Robin James Kinrade	508	16	+3
Liberal Democrats	Derek John Mortimer	831	26	+1
Majority		1,053	42	
Turnout		3,223	30	−10
Conservative hold		Swing		

Maidstone Rural West
Party	Candidate	Votes	%	±%
Conservative	Paulina Annette Veronica Stockell	1,886	43	−3
UKIP	Keith Clement Woollven	1,352	31	+16
Labour	Edith Maud Davis	445	10	+5
Liberal Democrats	Martin Cox	420	10	−16
Green	Ian McDonald	264	6	−1
Majority		534	12	
Turnout		4,367	31	−11
Conservative hold		Swing		

Maidstone South
Party	Candidate	Votes	%	±%
Liberal Democrats	Brian Eugene Clark	1,790	47	+18
Conservative	Christopher John Garland	1,112	29	−15
Labour	Geoff Harvey	586	15	+7
Green	Ashley James Wakeling	303	8	+1
Majority		678	18	
Turnout		3,791	28	−7
Liberal Democrats gain from Conservative		Swing		

Maidstone South East
Party	Candidate	Votes	%	±%
Conservative	Gary Cooke	1,056	44	+1
Labour	Malcolm McKay	773	32	+17
Green	Steven Fraser Muggeridge	284	12	+7
Liberal Democrats	David Sandru Naghi	272	11	−3
Majority		283	12	
Turnout		2,385	20	−8
Conservative hold		Swing		

=== Sevenoaks ===
There are seven single-member constituencies within the District of Sevenoaks which elect to Kent County Council. Below are the results:

Darent Valley
Party	Candidate	Votes	%	±%
Conservative	Roger Gough	1,677	49	−1
UKIP	Alun Elder-Brown	897	26	N/A
Labour	Kevin Roger Flack	647	19	+8
Liberal Democrats	Philip Neil Hobson	166	5	−15
English Democrat	Jim Read	65	2	−17
Majority		880	23	
Turnout		3,452	27	−12
Conservative hold		Swing		

Sevenoaks Central
Party	Candidate	Votes	%	±%
Conservative	Margaret Eileen Crabtree	2,171	56	−3
UKIP	Marcus Von Thiele	603	15	N/A
Liberal Democrats	Lise Shay Michaelides	578	15	−6
Labour	Nick Dineen	389	10	+4
Independent	Mark Calder Ellis	112	3	N/A
English Democrat	Paul Cooper	48	1	−4
Majority		1,568	41	
Turnout		3,901	30	−13
Conservative hold		Swing		

Sevenoaks East
Party	Candidate	Votes	%	±%
Conservative	Nick Chard	1,715	51	−1
UKIP	Christine Jennifer Marshall	830	25	N/A
Liberal Democrats	Richard Charles Wassell	455	13	−11
Labour	Meg Warne	332	10	+6
English Democrat	Darren Tomlin	45	1	−10
Majority		885	26	
Turnout		3,377	27	−14
Conservative hold		Swing		

Sevenoaks North East
Party	Candidate	Votes	%	±%
Conservative	David Brazier	1,843	49	−7
UKIP	Richard John Harrington	1,160	31	N/A
Labour	Jim Weekes	495	13	+3
Green	Mark Richard Lindop	226	6	N/A
English Democrat	Louise Uncles	67	2	−19
Majority		683	18	
Turnout		3,791	27	−10
Conservative hold		Swing		

Sevenoaks South
Party	Candidate	Votes	%	±%
Conservative	Clive Roger Pearman	1,575	46	−6
UKIP	Lorraine Millgate	898	26	N/A
Liberal Democrats	Richard Giles Streatfeild	573	17	−6
Labour	Thomas Dundas Geldard	329	10	N/A
English Democrat	Chris Dunmall	41	1	−11
Majority		677	20	
Turnout		3,416	28	−13
Conservative hold		Swing		

Sevenoaks West
Party	Candidate	Votes	%	±%
Conservative	Richard Parry	1,687	51	−4
UKIP	Andrew Osborne	891	27	N/A
Labour	Gregory Stewart Lovell	263	8	+3
Liberal Democrats	Allan John Gidley Wright	227	7	−8
Green	Amelie Elisabeth Boleyn	220	7	N/A
English Democrat	Andy Waghorn	21	1	−8
Majority		796	24	
Turnout		3,309	27	−14
Conservative hold		Swing		

Swanley
Party	Candidate	Votes	%	±%
Conservative	Robert Brookbank	1,032	41	−2
Labour	Michael Hogg	812	32	+9
UKIP	Colin Attridge	501	20	N/A
Green	Aleks Szram	77	3	N/A
English Democrat	Steve Uncles	60	2	−21
BNP	Eric Elliott	32	1	N/A
Majority		220	9	
Turnout		2,514	22	−11
Conservative hold		Swing		

=== Shepway ===
There are six single-member constituencies within the District of Shepway, that elect councillors to Kent County Council. The results are:

Elham Valley
Party	Candidate	Votes	%	±%
Conservative	Susan Joan Carey	3,519	44	−12
UKIP	Nick Jack	1,861	34	+14
Labour	Claire Jeffrey	799	15	+9
Liberal Democrats	Tom McNeice	398	7	−7
Majority		562	10	
Turnout		5,451	35	−9
Conservative hold		Swing		

Folkestone North East
Party	Candidate	Votes	%	±%
UKIP	Frank McKenna	910	29	+12
Independent	Brian William Copping	846	27	+2
Conservative	Ann Elizabeth Berry	664	21	−6
Liberal Democrats	Lynne Beaumont	404	13	−9
Labour	Paul Richard Bingham	324	10	+3
Majority		64	2	
Turnout		3166	25%	−9
UKIP gain from Conservative		Swing		

Folkestone South
Party	Candidate	Votes	%	±%
UKIP	Bob Neaves	1,006	33	+10
Conservative	Rory Cassian Love	989	33	−10
Labour	Ben Hart	639	21	+11
Liberal Democrats	Gary Fuller	353	12	−12
BNP	Harry Williams	41	1	N/A
Majority		17	0	
Turnout		3028	24	−10
UKIP gain from Conservative		Swing		

Folkestone West
Party	Candidate	Votes	%	±%
UKIP	Hod Birkby	1,155	33	+10
Liberal Democrats	Tim Prater	903	26	+2
Conservative	Robert Bliss	763	22	+21
Labour	Peter Wallace	354	10	0
Green	Derek John Moran	238	7	N/A
TUSC	Seth Cruse	86	2	N/A
Majority		252	7	
Turnout		3,514	29	−5
UKIP gain from Liberal Democrats		Swing		

Hythe
Party	Candidate	Votes	%	±%
Green	Martin Edward Whybrow	1,659	35	N/A
Conservative	David Drury Monk	1,346	28	−26
UKIP	Georgina Baker	1,100	23	+9
Labour	Paul Anthony Brownscombe	418	9	+4
Liberal Democrats	Neil Matthews	248	5	−18
Majority		313	7	
Turnout		4771	40	−6
Green hold		Swing		

Romney Marsh
Party	Candidate	Votes	%	±%
UKIP	David Baker	2,233	39	+15
Conservative	Carole Joy Waters	2,213	39	−7
Labour	Arran Harvey	725	13	+6
Green	Ross Carter	319	6	N/A
Liberal Democrats	Ted Last	237	4	−9
Majority		20	0	
Turnout		5743	32	−7
UKIP hold		Swing		

=== Swale ===
There are six single-member constituencies and one multi-member constituencies within the Borough of Swale, which elect a total of eight councillors to Kent County Council. Below are the results:

Faversham
Party	Candidate	Votes	%	±%
Conservative	Tom Gates	1,958	45	−2
Labour	Trevor Raymond Payne	1337	31	+18
UKIP	Benjamin Bruce Moss	867	20	+7
Liberal Democrats	David John Spurling	169	4	−12
Majority		621	14	
Turnout		4331	30	−7
Conservative hold		Swing		

Sheerness
Party	Candidate	Votes	%	±%
Labour	Angela Harrison	1,185	40	+11
UKIP	Maureen Morgan	1,036	35	
Conservative	Richard William Darby	734	25	−9
Majority		149	5	
Turnout		2,955	23	−6
Labour gain from Conservative		Swing		

Sheppey
Party	Candidate	Votes	%	±%
UKIP	Adrian Derwent Crowther	1,791	44	
Conservative	Ken Pugh	1,066	26	−15
Labour	Patrick John Wiggins	900	22	+7
Liberal Democrats	David Richard Kemp	100	2	−6
TUSC	Mike Rolfe	97	2	
Monster Raving Loony	Young Mad Mike	88	2	−4
Majority		725	18	
Turnout		4,042	27	−3
UKIP gain from Conservative		Swing		

Swale Central (2)
Party	Candidate	Votes	%	±%
Labour	Roger Truelove	2,729	18	+2
UKIP	Lee Burgess	2,603	17	
UKIP	Derek Carnell	2,415	16	
Labour	Ghlin Maurice Whelan	2,389	15	+2
Conservative	Mike Whiting	2,334	15	−9
Conservative	Alan Thomas Willicombe	2,207	14	−9
Liberal Democrats	Anthea Mary Spurling	386	2	−9
Liberal Democrats	Mary Zeng	331	2	−8
Monster Raving Loony	Sheikh Mihand	127	1	−2
Majority		188	1	
Turnout		15,521	29	−4
Labour gain from Conservative		Swing		
UKIP gain from Conservative		Swing		

Swale East
Party	Candidate	Votes	%	±%
Conservative	Andrew Harry Thomas Bowles	1,882	46	−4
UKIP	Stephen Trafford	1,109	27	+12
Labour	Ashley Luke Wise	825	20	+9
Liberal Democrats	Dave Banks	282	7	−5
Majority		773	19	
Turnout		4,098	28	−6
Conservative hold		Swing		

Swale West
Party	Candidate	Votes	%	±%
UKIP	Mike Baldock	2,097	51	
Conservative	Keith Anthony Ferrin	1,315	32	−24
Labour	Leslie Peter Hallybone	489	12	−3
Liberal Democrats	Ann Scott Mclean	181	4	−25
Majority		783	19	
Turnout		4,081	30	−5
UKIP gain from Conservative		Swing		

=== Thanet ===
There are two single-member and three multi-member constituencies within the District of Thanet, which elect a total of eight councillors to Kent County Council. Below are the results:

Birchington and Villages
Party	Candidate	Votes	%	±%
UKIP	Roger Anthony Latchford	2,156	47	N/A
Conservative	Michael James Jarvis	1,494	32	−20
Labour	Amy Florence Rutland	649	14	+4
Liberal Democrats	Bill Furness	315	7	−12
Majority		662	15	
Turnout		4,614	34	−6
UKIP gain from Conservative		Swing		

Broadstairs and Sir Moses Montefiore (2 Seats)
Party	Candidate	Votes	%	±%
UKIP	Alan Terry	2,797	20	N/A
UKIP	Zita Wiltshire	2,756	19	N/A
Conservative	Robert William Bayford	2,182	15	−13
Conservative	Bill Hayton	2,094	15	−11
Labour	Jenny Matterface	1,854	13	+3
Labour	Dick Symonds	1,608	11	0
Green	Louisa June Rachel Latham	427	3	N/A
Liberal Democrats	Louisa June Rachel Latham	338	2	−11
Liberal Democrats	Seth Procter	265	2	−9
Majority		574	4	
Turnout		14,321	33	−3
UKIP gain from Conservative		Swing		
UKIP gain from Conservative		Swing		

Margate and Cliftonville (2 Seats)
Party	Candidate	Votes	%	±%
UKIP	Mo Elenor	2,070	18	+3
Labour	William Scobie	2,059	18	0
Labour	Louise Drelaud	2,000	17	−1
UKIP	Clinton Sear	1,811	16	N/A
Conservative	Ian James Gregory	1,428	12	−8
Conservative	Chris Wells	1,354	12	−9
Green	Edward Targett	276	2	N/A
Liberal Democrats	Matt Brown	247	2	−3
Liberal Democrats	Tony Flaig	222	2	−1
Majority		59	1	
Turnout		11,467	27	−4
UKIP gain from Conservative		Swing		
Labour gain from Conservative		Swing		

Margate West
Party	Candidate	Votes	%	±%
UKIP	Jeffrey Elenor	1,292	36	+14
Conservative	Robert Barry Burgess	915	26	−19
Labour	John Edwards	728	20	+6
Independent	Thomas George King	550	15	N/A
Liberal Democrats	Michael Steed	77	2	−11
Majority		377	10	
Turnout		3,562	29	−2
UKIP gain from Conservative		Swing		

Ramsgate (2 Seats)
Party	Candidate	Votes	%	±%
UKIP	Trevor Shonk	3,347	22	+8
UKIP	Martyn Heale	3,044	20	N/A
Labour	Elizabeth Green	2,478	16	0
Labour	Rick Everitt	2,258	15	+2
Conservative	John Derek Kirby	1,583	10	−9
Conservative	Jo Gideon	1,458	9	−6
Independent	Ian Driver	567	4	N/A
Green	Mike White	471	3	N/A
Liberal Democrats	Anne Elizabeth Jones	211	1	−5
Majority		566	4	
Turnout		15,417	31	−4
UKIP gain from Conservative		Swing		
UKIP gain from Labour		Swing		

=== Tonbridge and Malling ===
There are five single-member constituencies and one multi-member constituency within the District of Tonbridge and Malling, which elect a total of seven councillors to Kent County Council. Below are the results:

Malling Central
Party	Candidate	Votes	%	±%
Liberal Democrats	Trudy Dean	2,209	55	−1
Conservative	Russ Taylor	793	20	−5
UKIP	Peter Graham Stevens	658	16	+6
Labour	Sarah Rosalind Palmer	283	7	+3
Green	Stephen Greville Jackson	56	1	−2
English Democrat	Anna Cleves	20	0	−2
Majority		1416	35	
Turnout		4,019	34	−4
Liberal Democrats hold		Swing		

Malling North
Party	Candidate	Votes	%	±%
Conservative	Sarah Virginia Hohler	1,869	46	−3
Labour	Paul Michael Hickmott	1,112	27	+5
UKIP	Philip John Granger	803	20	N/A
Liberal Democrats	Liz Simpson	158	4	−7
Green	Mark West	118	3	−5
English Democrat	Lee Jon	31	1	−8
Majority		757	19	
Turnout		4,091	31	−6
Conservative hold		Swing		

Malling Rural East
Party	Candidate	Votes	%	±%
Conservative	Matthew Aiden Craig Balfour	1,781	48	−10
UKIP	David Leonard Waller	1,185	32	+19
Labour	Terry Scott	350	9	+3
Liberal Democrats	Stephen James Patt	201	5	−7
Green	Frances Mary Long	158	4	−4
English Democrat	Liz Uncles	26	1	−3
Majority		596	16	
Turnout		3,701	30	−8
Conservative hold		Swing		

Malling Rural North East
Party	Candidate	Votes	%	±%
Conservative	Peter John Homewood	1,856	46	−11
UKIP	Angela Love	1,098	27	N/A
Labour	James Aiden Yearsley	635	16	+9
Liberal Democrats	Anita Sandra Oakley	315	8	−14
Green	Howard Porter	123	3	+3
English Democrat	Steve Uncles	42	1	−7
Majority		758	19	
Turnout		4,069	29	−12
Conservative hold		Swing		

Malling West
Party	Candidate	Votes	%	±%
Conservative	Valerie Dagger	1,949	55	−7
UKIP	Clifford John Leslie Millgate	844	24	N/A
Labour	Kathleen Maria Garlick	319	9	+3
Green	Richard Paul Mountford	194	5	−4
Liberal Democrats	Jason Lower	186	5	−9
English Democrat	Helen Stevens	37	1	−8
Majority		1,105	31	
Turnout		3,529	30	−13
Conservative hold		Swing		

Tonbridge (2 Seats)
Party	Candidate	Votes	%	±%
Conservative	Richard Long, TD	3,406	24	−2
Conservative	Chris Smith	3,123	22	−1
UKIP	Roy Alfred Philpott	1,664	12	+5
UKIP	Adrian John Stevens	1,443	10	+4
Labour	Claire Suzanne Leigh	1,104	8	+3
Labour	Bob Ellard	1,012	7	+3
Green	Hazel Dawe	633	5	−1
Liberal Democrats	Garry Christopher Bridge	573	4	−4
Liberal Democrats	Nicholas Sebastian Scott Ford	526	4	−5
Green	Steven Mark Dawe	515	4	−1
Majority		1,459	10	
Turnout		13,999	28	−11
Conservative hold		Swing		
Conservative hold		Swing		

=== Tunbridge Wells ===
There are six single-member constituencies within the Borough of Tunbridge Wells. Below are the results:

Cranbrook (includes Hawkhurst)
Party	Candidate	Votes	%	±%
Conservative	Sean Holden	1,553	41	−25
UKIP	John Cave Austen	1,065	28	N/A
Liberal Democrats	Francis John Rook	686	18	−9
Labour	David Burgess	293	8	+2
Green	Marie Louise Jones	202	5	N/A
Majority		498	13	
Turnout		3,799	33	−8
Conservative hold		Swing		

Tunbridge Wells East
Party	Candidate	Votes	%	±%
UKIP	Christopher Pierce David Hoare	1,386	31	+19
Conservative	James Tansley	1,064	23	−26
Liberal Democrats	David John Neve	1,005	22	−10
Independent	Terry Cload	694	15	N/A
Labour	Gerry Colley	379	8	+1
Majority		322	8	
Turnout		4,528	34	−4
UKIP gain from Conservative		Swing		

Tunbridge Wells North
Party	Candidate	Votes	%	±%
Conservative	Peter John Oakford	1,373	35	−3
UKIP	Brian Charles Ransley	958	24	+10
Labour	Ian Patrick Carvell	672	17	+4
Liberal Democrats	Trevor William Poile	666	17	−18
Green	Phyllis Valerie Leslie	262	7	N/A
Majority		415	11	
Turnout		3,931	29	−8
Conservative hold		Swing		

Tunbridge Wells Rural
Party	Candidate	Votes	%	±%
Conservative	Alex King, MBE	2,043	43	−21
UKIP	Gabi Coleman	1,692	36	N/A
Labour	Raymond Peter Moon	632	13	+3
Liberal Democrats	Lesley Elizabeth Herriot	368	8	−18
Majority		351	7	
Turnout		4,735	31	−6
Conservative hold		Swing		

Tunbridge Wells South
Party	Candidate	Votes	%	±%
Conservative	James Edward Scholes	1,926	46	−16
UKIP	Zak Martin	1,109	26	N/A
Labour	Lorna Blackmore	616	15	+7
Liberal Democrats	Rachel Cerys Sadler	534	13	−17
Majority		817	20	
Turnout		4,185	30	−9
Conservative hold		Swing		

Tunbridge Wells West
Party	Candidate	Votes	%	±%
Conservative	John Davies	1,831	41	−11
UKIP	Victor Charles Webb	1,502	33	+21
Labour	Alex Britcher	496	11	+5
Liberal Democrats	Alan James Bullion	357	8	−9
Green	David Charles Holton	316	7	−5
Majority		329	8	
Turnout		4,502	32	−2
Conservative hold		Swing		
