= 2003 Ashford Borough Council election =

Borough Council elections of 1 May 2003

Map of the results of the 2003 Ashford council election.

Elections to Ashford Borough Council were held on 1 May 2003. The whole council was up for election with boundary changes since the last election in 1999 reducing the number of seats by 6. The Conservative Party gained control of the council from no overall control.

== Election result ==
Ashford local election result 2003
Party	Seats	Gains	Losses	Net gain/loss	Seats %	Votes %	Votes	+/−
Conservative	25			+2	58.1	47.7	13,624	
Ashford Ind.	9			+9	20.9	16.9	4,838	
Liberal Democrats	5			-2	11.6	19.7	5,622	
Labour	4			-6	9.3	12.5	3,569	
Green	0			0	0	1.6	453	
Independent	0			0	0	1.3	359	
National Front	0			0	0	0.3	98	

== Ward results ==
Aylesford Green
Party	Candidate	Votes	%	±%
Ashford Ind.	Robert Enock	168	33.5	
Labour	Martin Allcock	133	26.5	
Liberal Democrats	Rodney Norris	98	19.5	
Conservative	James Holtum	52	10.4	
National Front	John Kellam	51	10.2	
Majority		35	7.0	
Turnout		502	26.3	

Beaver (2)
Party	Candidate	Votes	%	±%
Labour	Alan Allcock	636		
Labour	Allen Wells	619		
Conservative	Gillian Taylor-Lowen	261		
Conservative	Janet Rymer-Jones	259		
Turnout		1,775	24.3	

Biddenden
Party	Candidate	Votes	%	±%
Conservative	Neil Bell	507	77.5	
Liberal Democrats	William Platt	147	22.5	
Majority		360	55.0	
Turnout		654	34.2	

Bockhanger
Party	Candidate	Votes	%	±%
Conservative	Noel Greaves	350	59.8	
Labour	Simon Storer	235	40.2	
Majority		115	19.6	
Turnout		585	32.2	

Boughton Aluph & Eastwell
Party	Candidate	Votes	%	±%
Liberal Democrats	Rita Hawes	391	71.6	
Conservative	Stephen Killick	155	28.4	
Majority		236	43.2	
Turnout		546	29.9	

Bybrook
Party	Candidate	Votes	%	±%
Conservative	Marlon Martin	381	62.8	
Labour	Madhanagopal Permall	226	37.2	
Majority		155	25.6	
Turnout		607	31.6	

Charing
Party	Candidate	Votes	%	±%
Conservative	Douglas Gillard	443	67.4	
Liberal Democrats	Leonard Micklewright	214	32.6	
Majority		229	34.8	
Turnout		657	25.4	

Downs North
Party	Candidate	Votes	%	±%
Conservative	Jane Marriott	599	79.1	
Liberal Democrats	Myrtle Butcher	158	20.9	
Majority		441	58.2	
Turnout		757	39.6	

Downs West
Party	Candidate	Votes	%	±%
Conservative	Neil Wallace	412	56.9	
Liberal Democrats	John Hawes	242	33.4	
Labour	Valerie Horton	70	9.7	
Majority		170	23.5	
Turnout		724	38.2	

Godington (2)
Party	Candidate	Votes	%	±%
Conservative	Peter Feacey	463		
Conservative	Bernard Heyes	406		
Labour	Ivor Groves	209		
Labour	Doreen Topley	193		
Liberal Democrats	Patricia Packham	175		
Green	Pauline Fillery	105		
Green	Lola Sansom	49		
Turnout		1,600	28.6	

Great Chart with Singleton North
Party	Candidate	Votes	%	±%
Ashford Ind.	Antony Maltby	298	56.5	
Conservative	Charles Campbell	189	35.9	
Liberal Democrats	Claire Yeo	40	7.6	
Majority		109	20.6	
Turnout		527	40.4	

Highfield
Party	Candidate	Votes	%	±%
Ashford Ind.	Maureen Larkin	299	47.2	
Liberal Democrats	Julian Norris	168	26.5	
Conservative	James Coultrip	167	26.3	
Majority		131	20.7	
Turnout		634	32.7	

Isle of Oxney
Party	Candidate	Votes	%	±%
Conservative	Michael Burgess	596	66.7	
Liberal Democrats	Barry Wright	189	21.1	
Labour	Katherine Manning	109	12.2	
Majority		407	45.6	
Turnout		894	43.5	

Kennington
Party	Candidate	Votes	%	±%
Conservative	John Kemp	465	71.4	
Liberal Democrats	Robert Rawlings	186	28.6	
Majority		279	42.8	
Turnout		651	36.2	

Little Burton Farm
Party	Candidate	Votes	%	±%
Conservative	Norman Ayres	405	67.2	
Liberal Democrats	Anthony Hardwick	118	19.6	
Labour	Muhammed Khan	80	13.3	
Majority		287	47.6	
Turnout		603	33.0	

Norman
Party	Candidate	Votes	%	±%
Ashford Ind.	Melvyn Elliff	223	35.7	
Liberal Democrats	Barbara Simmons	184	29.4	
Labour	Leslie Lawrie	146	23.3	
Conservative	Louis Parsons	72	11.5	
Majority		39	6.3	
Turnout		625	31.4	

North Willesborough (2)
Party	Candidate	Votes	%	±%
Liberal Democrats	Serge Koowaree	584		
Liberal Democrats	Robert Davidson	558		
Ashford Ind.	Robert Stubbs	374		
Conservative	Stephen Cochrane	364		
Ashford Ind.	Margaret Pryke	337		
Conservative	Douglas Marriott	294		
Labour	Matthew Kirk	135		
Turnout		2,646	36.4	

Park Farm North
Party	Candidate	Votes	%	±%
Ashford Ind.	Reginald Harrington	398	67.1	
Conservative	William Walker	153	25.8	
Liberal Democrats	David Hilliger	42	7.1	
Majority		245	41.3	
Turnout		593	27.2	

Park Farm South
Party	Candidate	Votes	%	±%
Conservative	James Wedgbury	244	61.8	
Ashford Ind.	Aline Hicks	151	38.2	
Majority		93	23.6	
Turnout		395	27.9	

Rolvenden & Tenterden West
Party	Candidate	Votes	%	±%
Conservative	Jill Hutchinson	645	77.0	
Liberal Democrats	Marion Murray	111	13.2	
Labour	James Knight	82	9.8	
Majority		534	63.8	
Turnout		838	43.0	

Saxon Shore (2)
Party	Candidate	Votes	%	±%
Conservative	Peter Wood	989		
Conservative	Bruce Claridge	947		
Ashford Ind.	Jack Woodford	395		
Liberal Democrats	Emily Nighbour	377		
Liberal Democrats	Robin Fletcher	302		
Turnout		3,010	43.6	

Singleton South
Party	Candidate	Votes	%	±%
Ashford Ind.	Carol Brunger	191	38.6	
Conservative	Clair Bell	175	35.4	
Labour	Stephen Williams	129	26.1	
Majority		16	3.2	
Turnout		495	27.3	

South Willesborough
Party	Candidate	Votes	%	±%
Ashford Ind.	Malcolm Eke	327	68.6	
Liberal Democrats	Jennifer Blackman	105	22.0	
Conservative	Charles Vavasour	45	9.4	
Majority		222	46.6	
Turnout		477	30.8	

St Michaels
Party	Candidate	Votes	%	±%
Conservative	John Link	534	80.4	
Liberal Democrats	Oliver Dove	130	19.6	
Majority		404	60.8	
Turnout		664	34.6	

Stanhope
Party	Candidate	Votes	%	±%
Labour	Harriet Yeo	173	46.0	
Liberal Democrats	Victoria Macdonald	103	27.4	
Conservative	John Smith	53	14.1	
National Front	Terry Blackham	47	12.5	
Majority		70	18.6	
Turnout		376	18.7	

Stour (2)
Party	Candidate	Votes	%	±%
Labour	Michael Hubert	458		
Conservative	Matthew French	414		
Labour	Walter Davies	406		
Conservative	Christopher Main	402		
Liberal Democrats	Jacqueline Smith	312		
Liberal Democrats	Stephen Smith	233		
Turnout		2,225	30.2	

Tenterden North
Party	Candidate	Votes	%	±%
Conservative	Paul Clokie	466	66.9	
Liberal Democrats	Stuart Dove	231	33.1	
Majority		235	33.8	
Turnout		697	38.7	

Tenterden South
Party	Candidate	Votes	%	±%
Conservative	Peter Goddard	411	66.1	
Liberal Democrats	Patricia Rickwood	124	19.9	
Labour	Michael Kirk	87	14.0	
Majority		287	46.2	
Turnout		622	35.0	

Victoria (2)
Party	Candidate	Votes	%	±%
Liberal Democrats	Robert Packham	342		
Liberal Democrats	Robert Cowley	333		
Labour	Derek Madgett	324		
Labour	Brendan Naughton	320		
Conservative	Michael Rice	198		
Conservative	Carmela Kegos	190		
Green	Hazel Dawe	96		
Green	Sharon Harvey	60		
Turnout		1,863	25.7	

Washford
Party	Candidate	Votes	%	±%
Ashford Ind.	John Holland	164	34.5	
Conservative	Antonia Missions	159	33.4	
Labour	Campbell Miller	153	32.1	
Majority		5	1.1	
Turnout		476	27.5	

Weald Central (2)
Party	Candidate	Votes	%	±%
Conservative	Robert Taylor	975		
Conservative	Mark Wickham	930		
Ashford Ind.	Keith Brannan	563		
Liberal Democrats	Jonathan Heuch	308		
Labour	John Moriarty	184		
Turnout		2,960	39.7	

Weald East
Party	Candidate	Votes	%	±%
Conservative	Paul Bartlett	357	57.5	
Ashford Ind.	Michael Ciccone	264	42.5	
Majority		93	15.0	
Turnout		621	41.4	

Weald North
Party	Candidate	Votes	%	±%
Conservative	Rita Kelly	538	58.0	
Liberal Democrats	Clare Hardwick	225	24.2	
Ashford Ind.	Derek Swann	165	17.8	
Majority		313	33.8	
Turnout		928	49.6	

Weald South (2)
Party	Candidate	Votes	%	±%
Conservative	George Weller	900		
Ashford Ind.	Peter Davison	858		
Conservative	Michael Lancaster	706		
Independent	Edward Relf	359		
Liberal Democrats	Rosemary Davies	261		
Labour	Gemma Carter	259		
Turnout		3,343	45.2	

Wye
Party	Candidate	Votes	%	±%
Conservative	Ian Cooling	470	60.3	
Green	Steven Dawe	252	32.3	
Liberal Democrats	Nicholas Fawcett	57	7.3	
Majority		218	28.0	
Turnout		779	43.6	
