= 2011 Ashford Borough Council election =

2011 UK local government election

Map of results of 2011 election

The 2011 Ashford Borough Council election took place on 5 May 2011 to elect members of Ashford Borough Council in Kent, England. The whole council was up for election and the Conservative Party stayed in overall control of the council.

== Election result ==
The Conservatives gained 2 seats to have 30 of the 43 councillors. Labour picked up 3 seats, while the Ashford Independents made a net gain of 1 seat, to both have 5 councillors. Meanwhile, the Liberal Democrats were reduced to just 2 seats in North Willesborough and Victoria wards, a result that was blamed on the party's national unpopularity. Overall turnout in the election was 56%.

Ashford local election result 2011
Party	Seats	Gains	Losses	Net gain/loss	Seats %	Votes %	Votes	+/−
Conservative	30	3	1	+2	69.8	46.8	21,836	-6.0%
Ashford Ind.	5	4	3	+1	11.6	19.9	9,276	+19.9%
Labour	5	3	0	+3	11.6	10.5	4,914	+3.4%
Liberal Democrats	2	0	6	-6	4.7	10.4	4,852	-17.5%
Independent	1	0	0	0	2.3	8.1	3,762	-3.2%
Green	0	0	0	0	0	2.4	1,135	+1.5%
UKIP	0	0	0	0	0	1.8	853	+1.8%

2 Conservative candidates were elected unopposed.

== Ward results ==
Aylesford Green
Party	Candidate	Votes	%	±%
Labour	David Adley	241	36.3	+36.3
Ashford Ind.	Brian Norris	240	36.1	−2.3
Conservative	Paul Hardisty	183	27.6	+6.4
Majority		1	0.2	
Turnout		664	34.3	+6.1
Labour gain from Liberal Democrats		Swing		

Beaver (2)
Party	Candidate	Votes	%	±%
Labour	Chris Clark	481		
Labour	Brendan Naughton	479		
Conservative	Stephen Bates	452		
Conservative	Cenghizhan Jem	335		
Ashford Ind.	Laura Lawrence	308		
Ashford Ind.	Stacey Smith	261		
Turnout		2,316	33.8	+5.1
Labour hold		Swing		
Labour hold		Swing		

Biddenden
Party	Candidate	Votes	%	±%
Conservative	Neil Bell	776	80.4	+6.4
Liberal Democrats	Clare Hardwick	189	19.6	−6.4
Majority		587	60.8	+12.8
Turnout		965	48.1	+5.4
Conservative hold		Swing		

Bockhanger
Party	Candidate	Votes	%	±%
Conservative	Michael Claughton	407	50.7	−11.4
Ashford Ind.	Shirley Ambrose	208	25.9	+25.9
Labour	Thomas Reed	123	15.3	−7.9
Green	Steven Campkin	65	8.1	+8.1
Majority		199	24.8	−14.1
Turnout		80.3	44.3	+8.9
Conservative hold		Swing		

Boughton Aluph & Eastwell
Party	Candidate	Votes	%	±%
Ashford Ind.	Winston Michael	401	38.9	+38.9
Liberal Democrats	Rita Hawes	367	35.6	−32.3
Conservative	Ian Cooling	262	25.4	−6.7
Majority		34	3.3	
Turnout		1,030	43.9	+8.4
Ashford Ind. gain from Liberal Democrats		Swing		

Bybrook
Party	Candidate	Votes	%	±%
Conservative	Andrew Buchanan	300	36.8	−17.8
Ashford Ind.	John Ley	282	34.6	+34.6
Liberal Democrats	Christopher Took	234	28.7	−16.7
Majority		18	2.2	−7.0
Turnout		816	41.9	+2.2
Conservative hold		Swing		

Charing
Party	Candidate	Votes	%	±%
Conservative	Gerald Clarkson	674	68.1	−5.0
Liberal Democrats	George Whyte	315	31.9	+5.0
Majority		359	36.3	−9.9
Turnout		989	49.5	+9.5
Conservative hold		Swing		

Downs North
Party	Candidate	Votes	%	±%
Conservative	Douglas Marriott	580	56.8	−3.1
Ashford Ind.	Sarah Dacre	279	27.3	+27.3
Green	Geoffery Meaden	162	15.9	−12.2
Majority		301	29.5	−2.3
Turnout		1,021	52.5	+7.1
Conservative hold		Swing		

Downs West
Party	Candidate	Votes	%	±%
Conservative	David Robey	456	49.0	−18.0
Ashford Ind.	Antony Bartlett	280	30.1	+30.1
Green	Lola Sansom	113	12.1	+12.1
Liberal Democrats	Leonard Wicklewright	82	8.8	−12.9
Majority		176	18.9	−36.4
Turnout		931	49.7	−10.9
Conservative hold		Swing		

Godinton (2)
Party	Candidate	Votes	%	±%
Conservative	Peter Feacey	935		
Conservative	Bernard Heyes	801		
UKIP	David Botting	370		
Ashford Ind.	Rachel Moorat	368		
Independent	Michael Sharpe	291		
Turnout		2,765	39.6	+6.5
Conservative hold		Swing		
Conservative hold		Swing		

Great Chart with Singleton North
Party	Candidate	Votes	%	±%
Conservative	Jessamy Blanford	423	42.2	−6.3
Ashford Ind.	Jerry Preston-Ladd	400	39.9	+15.9
Labour	Waheed Qureshi	179	17.9	+7.6
Majority		23	2.3	−22.2
Turnout		1,002	38.3	+5.3
Conservative hold		Swing		

Highfield
Party	Candidate	Votes	%	±%
Ashford Ind.	Jane Davey	376	44.4	+23.7
Conservative	Gregory Winter	311	36.8	−1.9
Liberal Democrats	John Mackie	159	18.8	−21.8
Majority		65	7.6	
Turnout		846	44.7	+8.3
Ashford Ind. gain from Liberal Democrats		Swing		

Isle of Oxney
Party	Candidate	Votes	%	±%
Conservative	Michael Burgess	unopposed		
Conservative hold		Swing		

Kennington
Party	Candidate	Votes	%	±%
Ashford Ind.	Philip Sims	440	45.7	
Conservative	Elizabeth Tweed	415	43.1	
Labour	Robert Maxted	107	11.1	
Majority		25	2.6	
Turnout		962	54.0	
Ashford Ind. gain from Conservative		Swing		

Little Burton Farm
Party	Candidate	Votes	%	±%
Conservative	Marion Martin	505	50.0	−23.5
Liberal Democrats	Kelly-Marie Blundell	195	19.3	−7.2
Ashford Ind.	Charlotte Fraser	171	16.9	+16.9
Labour	Terry Pavlou	138	13.7	+13.7
Majority		310	30.7	−16.3
Turnout		1,009	46.2	+9.2
Conservative hold		Swing		

Norman
Party	Candidate	Votes	%	±%
Labour	Harriet Yeo	224	30.5	+30.5
Conservative	Richard Davis	202	27.5	+9.0
Ashford Ind.	Abigail Burt	165	22.4	+9.9
Liberal Democrats	Jack Cowen	144	19.6	−19.0
Majority		22	3.0	
Turnout		735	37.3	+7.9
Labour gain from Liberal Democrats		Swing		

North Willesborough (2)
Party	Candidate	Votes	%	±%
Liberal Democrats	Robert Davidson	624		
Ashford Ind.	Andrew Mortimer	522		
Liberal Democrats	Robert Cowley	502		
Ashford Ind.	Simon Thomason	452		
Conservative	Alex Bell	446		
Conservative	Alan Pickering	351		
Labour	Leonardo Cannon	302		
Turnout		3,199	46.7	+8.3
Liberal Democrats hold		Swing		
Ashford Ind. gain from Liberal Democrats		Swing		

Park Farm North
Party	Candidate	Votes	%	±%
Conservative	Bettina Heyes	540	54.4	−11.6
Labour	Martin Chandler	214	21.6	+6.6
Ashford Ind.	Natalie Edwards-Moss	163	16.4	+16.4
Liberal Democrats	Stuart Dove	75	7.6	−11.5
Majority		326	32.9	−14.0
Turnout		992	41.0	+10.8
Conservative hold		Swing		

Park Farm South
Party	Candidate	Votes	%	±%
Conservative	James Wedgbury	489	73.4	−7.6
Labour	Thomas Devine	177	26.6	+16.1
Majority		312	46.8	−23.7
Turnout		666	32.5	+2.5
Conservative hold		Swing		

Rolvenden & Tenterden West
Party	Candidate	Votes	%	±%
Conservative	Michael Bennett	586	52.5	−29.1
Ashford Ind.	Juliet Fenton	438	39.2	+39.2
Liberal Democrats	Marion Murray	93	8.3	−10.1
Majority		148	13.2	−50.0
Turnout		1,117	58.3	+9.7
Conservative hold		Swing		

Saxon Shore (2)
Party	Candidate	Votes	%	±%
Conservative	Peter Wood	1,194		
Conservative	William Howard	1,019		
Ashford Ind.	Susan Davison	535		
Green	Tracy Dighton-Brown	496		
Liberal Democrats	Rosemary Davies	340		
Turnout		3,584	52.7	+11.4
Conservative hold		Swing		
Conservative hold		Swing		

Singleton South
Party	Candidate	Votes	%	±%
Conservative	Amanda Hodgkinson	387	46.7	−0.3
Independent	Malcolm Eke	238	28.7	+28.7
Ashford Ind.	Terence Stock	126	15.2	+2.2
Independent	Jonathan Clarke	77	9.3	+9.3
Majority		149	18.0	−0.5
Turnout		828	37.5	+0.9
Conservative hold		Swing		

South Willesborough
Party	Candidate	Votes	%	±%
Independent	David Smith	526	63.8	+20.0
Labour	Sophie Griffiths	150	18.2	+18.2
Conservative	Carol Brook	148	18.0	+0.6
Majority		376	45.6	+23.9
Turnout		824	32.8	+5.6
Independent hold		Swing		

St Michaels
Party	Candidate	Votes	%	±%
Conservative	John Link	626	70.8	−4.2
Green	Matthew Stanley	187	21.2	+21.2
Liberal Democrats	Anthony Hardwick	71	8.0	−17.0
Majority		439	49.7	−0.3
Turnout		884	46.9	+8.7
Conservative hold		Swing		

Stanhope
Party	Candidate	Votes	%	±%
Labour	Brendan Chilton	286	56.2	+56.2
Ashford Ind.	Palma Laughton	223	43.8	−24.4
Majority		63	12.4	
Turnout		509	28.5	+8.2
Labour gain from Ashford Ind.		Swing		

Stour (2)
Party	Candidate	Votes	%	±%
Conservative	Graham Galpin	645		
Conservative	Matthew French	578		
Ashford Ind.	Emily Neighbour	382		
Labour	David Burt	366		
Labour	Angharad Yeo	310		
Ashford Ind.	James McDonald	268		
Liberal Democrats	Nadiya Yildirim	178		
Turnout		2,727	41.4	+5.6
Conservative hold		Swing		
Conservative hold		Swing		

Tenterden North
Party	Candidate	Votes	%	±%
Conservative	Paul Clokie	523	50.1	−19.0
Ashford Ind.	Gillian Whittaker	251	24.0	+24.0
Independent	Michael Pearson	146	14.0	+14.0
Labour	Rebecca Andrews	124	11.9	+11.9
Majority		272	26.1	−12.1
Turnout		1,044	56.7	+13.0
Conservative hold		Swing		

Tenterden South
Party	Candidate	Votes	%	±%
Conservative	Peter Goddard	546	58.8	−0.4
Ashford Ind.	Roy Isworth	382	41.2	+41.2
Majority		164	17.7	−0.7
Turnout		928	48.6	+8.5
Conservative hold		Swing		

Victoria (2)
Party	Candidate	Votes	%	±%
Liberal Democrats	Jeremy Adby	425		
Conservative	Harold Apps	387		
Labour	Roy Clark	370		
Liberal Democrats	Stephen Dye	361		
Labour	Susan Clark	347		
Conservative	Muhammed Khan	293		
Ashford Ind.	Karen Hopkins	189		
Ashford Ind.	Sarah Stanfield	185		
Turnout		2,557	36.9	+6.5
Liberal Democrats hold		Swing		
Conservative gain from Liberal Democrats		Swing		

Washford
Party	Candidate	Votes	%	±%
Conservative	Neil Shorter	329	37.7	+1.5
Independent	John Holland	253	29.0	+29.0
Labour	Robert Vincent	184	21.1	+6.6
Ashford Ind.	Simon Nelson	107	12.3	−26.5
Majority		76	8.7	
Turnout		873	36.3	+6.2
Conservative gain from Ashford Ind.		Swing		

Weald Central (2)
Party	Candidate	Votes	%	±%
Conservative	Clair Bell	1,113		
Conservative	Robert Taylor	999		
Ashford Ind.	Paul Andrews	470		
UKIP	Thomas Taylor	386		
Turnout		2,968	47.4	+4.6
Conservative hold		Swing		
Conservative hold		Swing		

Weald East
Party	Candidate	Votes	%	±%
Conservative	Paul Bartlett	uncontested		
Conservative hold		Swing		

Weald North
Party	Candidate	Votes	%	±%
Conservative	Geraldine Dyer	635	58.9	−13.0
Ashford Ind.	Timothy Lee	332	30.8	+30.8
Green	Hilary Jones	112	10.4	−2.1
Majority		303	28.1	−28.2
Turnout		1,079	55.8	−4.3
Conservative hold		Swing		

Weald South (2)
Party	Candidate	Votes	%	±%
Ashford Ind.	Peter Davison	1,020		
Conservative	Aline Hicks	992		
Conservative	John Rivers	601		
Independent	Edward Relf	525		
Independent	Hilary Moorby	440		
Liberal Democrats	Christine Stone	226		
Liberal Democrats	Ian Stone	183		
Turnout		3,987	52.5	+6.4
Ashford Ind. hold		Swing		
Conservative hold		Swing		

Wye
Party	Candidate	Votes	%	±%
Conservative	Steven Wright	392	38.9	+8.4
Ashford Ind.	Jack Woodford	318	31.5	−33.6
Labour	Alexander Latham	112	11.1	+11.1
UKIP	Mike Adams	97	9.6	+9.6
Liberal Democrats	Kenneth Blanshard	89	8.8	+4.4
Majority		74	7.4	
Turnout		1,008	55.5	+5.6
Conservative gain from Ashford Ind.		Swing		
