= 2007 Ashford Borough Council election =

2007 UK local government election

Map of the results of the 2007 Ashford council election.

Elections to Ashford Borough Council were held on 3 May 2007. The whole council was up for election and the Conservative Party held on to overall control of the council.

== Election result ==
Ashford local election result 2007
Party	Seats	Gains	Losses	Net gain/loss	Seats %	Votes %	Votes	+/−
Conservative	28	4	1	+3	65.1	51.4	15,624	+3.7
Liberal Democrats	8	3	0	+3	18.6	27.1	8,244	+7.4
Ashford Ind.	4	2	7	-5	9.3	13.0	3,945	-3.9
Labour	2	0	2	-2	4.7	6.3	1,909	-6.2
Independent	1	1	0	+1	2.3	1.1	348	-0.2
Green	0	0	0	0	0.0	1.2	355	-0.4

2 Conservatives were unopposed.

== Ward results ==
Aylesford Green
Party	Candidate	Votes	%	±%
Liberal Democrats	Brian Norris	209	40.3	+20.8
Ashford Ind.	Jim Gower	199	38.4	+4.9
Conservative	James Holtum	110	21.2	+10.8
Majority		10	1.9	
Turnout		518	28.2	+1.9
Liberal Democrats gain from Ashford Ind.		Swing		

Beaver (2)
Party	Candidate	Votes	%	±%
Labour	Brendan Naughton	554		
Labour	Allen Wells	545		
Conservative	Jenny Wedgbury	377		
Conservative	James Barrow	369		
Liberal Democrats	Jill Norris	184		
Liberal Democrats	Gwendoline Thornton	175		
Turnout		2,204	28.7	+4.4
Labour hold		Swing		
Labour hold		Swing		

Biddenden
Party	Candidate	Votes	%	±%
Conservative	Neil Bell	615	74.0	−3.5
Liberal Democrats	Paddy Platt	216	26.0	+3.5
Majority		399	48.0	−7.0
Turnout		831	42.7	+8.5
Conservative hold		Swing		

Bockhanger
Party	Candidate	Votes	%	±%
Conservative	Michael Claughton	391	62.1	+2.3
Labour	Shafi Khan	146	23.2	−17.0
Liberal Democrats	Josephine Took	93	14.8	+14.8
Majority		245	38.9	+19.3
Turnout		630	35.4	+3.2
Conservative hold		Swing		

Boughton Aluph & Eastwell
Party	Candidate	Votes	%	±%
Liberal Democrats	Rita Hawes	511	67.9	−3.7
Conservative	Michael Lloyd	242	32.1	+3.7
Majority		269	35.8	−7.4
Turnout		753	35.5	+5.6
Liberal Democrats hold		Swing		

Bybrook
Party	Candidate	Votes	%	±%
Conservative	Marlon Martin	411	54.6	−8.2
Liberal Democrats	Jeremy Adby	342	45.4	+45.4
Majority		69	9.2	−16.4
Turnout		753	39.7	+8.1
Conservative hold		Swing		

Charing
Party	Candidate	Votes	%	±%
Conservative	Gerry Clarkson	564	73.1	+5.7
Liberal Democrats	George Whyte	208	26.9	−5.7
Majority		356	46.2	+11.4
Turnout		772	40.0	+16.6
Conservative hold		Swing		

Downs North
Party	Candidate	Votes	%	±%
Conservative	Jane Marriott	511	59.9	−19.2
Green	Jan Cormack	240	28.1	+28.1
Liberal Democrats	Leonard Micklewight	102	12.0	−8.9
Majority		271	31.8	−26.4
Turnout		853	45.4	+5.8
Conservative hold		Swing		

Downs West
Party	Candidate	Votes	%	±%
Conservative	Neil Wallace	470	67.0	+10.1
Liberal Democrats	John Hawes	152	21.7	−11.7
Labour	Chris Twydell	79	11.3	+1.6
Majority		318	55.3	+31.8
Turnout		701	38.8	+0.6
Conservative hold		Swing		

Godinton (2)
Party	Candidate	Votes	%	±%
Conservative	Peter Feacey	798		
Conservative	Bernard Heyes	753		
Liberal Democrats	Patricia Packham	340		
Labour	Arthur Young	201		
Liberal Democrats	Paul Taig	200		
Turnout		2,292	33.1	+4.5
Conservative hold		Swing		
Conservative hold		Swing		

Great Chart with Singleton North
Party	Candidate	Votes	%	±%
Conservative	Jessamy Blanford	347	48.5	+12.6
Ashford Ind.	Ian McClintock	172	24.0	−32.5
Liberal Democrats	Christopher Atkins	123	17.2	+9.6
Labour	Katherine Manning	74	10.3	+10.3
Majority		175	24.5	+3.9
Turnout		716	33.0	−7.4
Conservative gain from Ashford Ind.		Swing		

Highfield
Party	Candidate	Votes	%	±%
Liberal Democrats	Susan Heaton	290	40.6	+14.1
Conservative	Steven Davis	277	38.7	+12.4
Ashford Ind.	Ieda Hogarth	148	20.7	−26.5
Majority		13	1.9	
Turnout		715	36.4	+3.7
Liberal Democrats gain from Ashford Ind.		Swing		

Isle of Oxney
Party	Candidate	Votes	%	±%
Conservative	Michael Burgess	722	77.7	+11.0
Liberal Democrats	Bob Rawlings	207	22.3	+1.2
Majority		515	55.4	+9.8
Turnout		929	45.5	+2.0
Conservative hold		Swing		

Kennington
Party	Candidate	Votes	%	±%
Conservative	John Kemp	uncontested		
Conservative hold		Swing		

Little Burton Farm
Party	Candidate	Votes	%	±%
Conservative	Norman Ayres	535	73.5	+6.3
Liberal Democrats	Anthony Hardwick	193	26.5	+6.9
Majority		342	47.0	−0.6
Turnout		728	37.0	+4.0
Conservative hold		Swing		

Norman
Party	Candidate	Votes	%	±%
Liberal Democrats	David Bradberry	228	38.6	+9.2
Ashford Ind.	Melvyn Elliff	179	30.3	−5.4
Conservative	Janet Rymer-Jones	109	18.5	+7.0
Independent	Abbie Burt	74	12.5	+12.5
Majority		49	8.3	+2.0
Turnout		590	30.4	−1.0
Liberal Democrats gain from Ashford Ind.		Swing		

North Willesborough (2)
Party	Candidate	Votes	%	±%
Liberal Democrats	George Koowaree	897		
Liberal Democrats	Bob Davidson	846		
Conservative	Alan Hutchinson	401		
Conservative	Josephine Masters	367		
Ashford Ind.	Stephen Horn	207		
Turnout		2,718	38.4	+2.0
Liberal Democrats hold		Swing		
Liberal Democrats hold		Swing		

Park Farm North
Party	Candidate	Votes	%	±%
Conservative	Tina Heyes	463	66.0	+40.2
Liberal Democrats	Ruth Kirby	134	19.1	+12.0
Labour	Harriet Yeo	105	15.0	+15.0
Majority		329	46.9	
Turnout		702	30.2	+3.0
Conservative gain from Ashford Ind.		Swing		

Park Farm South
Party	Candidate	Votes	%	±%
Conservative	Jim Wedgbury	371	81.0	+19.2
Labour	Angharad Yeo	48	10.5	+10.5
Liberal Democrats	Nicholas Fawcett	39	8.5	+8.5
Majority		323	70.5	+46.9
Turnout		458	30.0	+2.1
Conservative hold		Swing		

Rolvenden & Tenterden West
Party	Candidate	Votes	%	±%
Conservative	Jill Hutchinson	765	81.6	+4.6
Liberal Democrats	Terrence Brown	172	18.4	+5.2
Majority		593	63.2	−0.6
Turnout		937	48.6	−15.2
Conservative hold		Swing		

Saxon Shore (2)
Party	Candidate	Votes	%	±%
Conservative	Peter Wood	1,139		
Conservative	Richard Honey	1,137		
Liberal Democrats	Stuart Dove	506		
Liberal Democrats	Anne Baxter	486		
Turnout		3,268	41.3	−2.3
Conservative hold		Swing		
Conservative hold		Swing		

Singleton South
Party	Candidate	Votes	%	±%
Conservative	Amanda Hodgkinson	335	47.0	+11.6
Liberal Democrats	Chris Took	203	28.5	+28.5
Ashford Ind.	Carol Brunger	93	13.0	−25.6
Labour	Andrew Pharoah	82	11.5	−14.6
Majority		132	18.5	
Turnout		713	36.6	+9.3
Conservative gain from Ashford Ind.		Swing		

South Willesborough
Party	Candidate	Votes	%	±%
Independent	David Smith	274	43.8	+43.8
Liberal Democrats	Ian Smith	138	22.1	+0.1
Conservative	Miranda Kelly	109	17.4	+8.0
Ashford Ind.	Malcolm Eke	104	16.6	−52.0
Majority		136	21.7	
Turnout		625	27.2	−3.6
Independent gain from Ashford Ind.		Swing		

St Michaels
Party	Candidate	Votes	%	±%
Conservative	John Link	543	75.0	−5.4
Liberal Democrats	Patricia Rickwood	181	25.0	+5.4
Majority		462	50.0	−10.8
Turnout		724	38.2	+3.6
Conservative hold		Swing		

Stanhope
Party	Candidate	Votes	%	±%
Ashford Ind.	Palma Laughton	245	68.2	+68.2
Conservative	Robert Ackfield	57	15.9	+1.8
Liberal Democrats	Gill Stone	57	15.9	−11.5
Majority		188	52.3	
Turnout		359	20.3	+1.7
Ashford Ind. gain from Labour		Swing		

Stour (2)
Party	Candidate	Votes	%	±%
Conservative	William Howard	597		
Conservative	Matthew French	573		
Labour	Les Lawrie	413		
Labour	Chris Clark	344		
Liberal Democrats	Steve Smith	340		
Liberal Democrats	Kevin Rochester	278		
Turnout		2,635	35.8	+5.6
Conservative gain from Labour		Swing		
Conservative hold		Swing		

Tenterden North
Party	Candidate	Votes	%	±%
Conservative	Paul Clokie	528	69.1	+2.2
Liberal Democrats	Barry Wright	236	30.9	−2.2
Majority		292	38.2	+4.4
Turnout		764	43.7	+5.0
Conservative hold		Swing		

Tenterden South
Party	Candidate	Votes	%	±%
Conservative	Peter Goddard	433	59.2	−6.9
Liberal Democrats	John Miller	299	40.8	+20.9
Majority		134	18.4	−27.8
Turnout		732	40.1	+5.1
Conservative hold		Swing		

Victoria (2)
Party	Candidate	Votes	%	±%
Liberal Democrats	Robert Packham	529		
Liberal Democrats	Robert Cowley	522		
Conservative	Felicitie Sykes	218		
Conservative	Irene Hitchings	217		
Ashford Ind.	Terry Stock	215		
Ashford Ind.	Tony Serretiello	158		
Labour	Preeti Farooki	109		
Turnout		1,968	30.4	+4.7
Liberal Democrats hold		Swing		
Liberal Democrats hold		Swing		

Washford
Party	Candidate	Votes	%	±%
Ashford Ind.	John Holland	260	38.6	+4.1
Conservative	Stephen Bates	245	36.4	+3.0
Labour	Perry Calvert	98	14.5	−17.6
Liberal Democrats	Shaun Chamberlain	71	10.5	+10.5
Majority		15	2.2	+1.1
Turnout		674	30.1	+2.6
Ashford Ind. hold		Swing		

Weald Central (2)
Party	Candidate	Votes	%	±%
Conservative	Robert Taylor	950		
Conservative	Clair Bell	891		
Ashford Ind.	Keith Brannan	534		
Liberal Democrats	Ann Murray	371		
Liberal Democrats	Jon Heuch	224		
Turnout		2,970	42.8	+3.1
Conservative hold		Swing		
Conservative hold		Swing		

Weald East
Party	Candidate	Votes	%	±%
Conservative	Paul Bartlett	uncontested		
Conservative hold		Swing		

Weald North
Party	Candidate	Votes	%	±%
Conservative	Hugh Ellison	663	71.9	+13.9
Liberal Democrats	Clare Hardwick	144	15.6	−8.6
Green	Hilary Jones	115	12.5	+12.5
Majority		519	56.3	+22.5
Turnout		922	60.1	+10.5
Conservative hold		Swing		

Weald South (2)
Party	Candidate	Votes	%	±%
Ashford Ind.	Peter Davison	998		
Conservative	Aline Hicks	991		
Conservative	Neil Shorter	955		
Liberal Democrats	Rosemary Davies	449		
Turnout		3,393	46.1	+0.9
Ashford Ind. hold		Swing		
Conservative hold		Swing		

Wye
Party	Candidate	Votes	%	±%
Ashford Ind.	Jack Woodford	589	65.1	+65.1
Conservative	Ian Cooling	276	30.5	−29.8
Liberal Democrats	David Berrie	40	4.4	−2.9
Majority		313	34.6	
Turnout		905	49.9	+6.3
Ashford Ind. gain from Conservative		Swing		
