= 2009 Kent County Council election =

2009 UK local government election

← 2005	4 June 2009	2013 →

All 84 seats to Kent County Council 43 seats needed for a majority
	First party	Second party	Third party
Party	Conservative	Liberal Democrats	Labour
Seats won	74	7	2
Seat change	▲17	▼1	▼18
- 2009 local election results in Kent
Council control before election
Conservative
Council control after election
Conservative

The 2009 Kent County Council election was an election to all 84 seats on Kent County Council held on 2 May as part of the 2009 United Kingdom local elections. 84 councillors were elected from 72 electoral divisions, which returned either one or two county councillors each by first-past-the-post voting for a four-year term of office. The electoral divisions were the same as those used at the previous election in 2005. No elections were held in Medway, which is a unitary authority outside the area covered by the County Council.

All locally registered electors (British, Irish, Commonwealth and European Union citizens) who were aged 18 or over on Thursday 4 June 2009 were entitled to vote in the local elections. Those who were temporarily away from their ordinary address (for example, away working, on holiday, in student accommodation or in hospital) were also entitled to vote in the local elections, although those who had moved abroad and registered as overseas electors cannot vote in the local elections. It is possible to register to vote at more than one address (such as a university student who had a term-time address and lives at home during holidays) at the discretion of the local Electoral Register Office, but it remains an offence to vote more than once in the same local government election.

The Conservative Party was re-elected with an increased majority and the Liberal Democrats replaced Labour as the main opposition party.

== Summary of election results ==
Kent County Council Election Results 2009
Party	Seats	Gains	Losses	Net gain/loss	Seats %	Votes %	Votes	+/−
Conservative	74	19	2	+17	88.1%	47%		
Liberal Democrats	7	2	1	+1	8.3%	21%		
Labour	2	0	18	-18	2.4%	15%		
Residents	1	1	0	+1	1.2%	<1%		

== Council Composition ==
Prior to the election the composition of the council was:

↓
57	21	6
Conservative	Labour	LD

After the election the composition of the council was:

↓
74	7	2	1
Conservative	LD	Lab	R

LD – Liberal Democrats
Lab – Labour Party
R – Residents Association

== Results by district ==
Kent is divided into 12 regions: Ashford, Canterbury, Dartford, Dover, Gravesham, Maidstone, Sevenoaks, Folkestone and Hythe, Swale, Thanet, Tonbridge and Malling, and Tunbridge Wells.

=== Summary ===
Summary of results
Region	Conservative Party	Liberal Democrats	Labour Party	Residents Association	Total
Ashford	6	1	0	0	7
Canterbury	8	1	0	0	9
Dartford	5	0	0	1	6
Dover	7	0	0	0	7
Gravesham	4	0	1	0	5
Maidstone	6	3	0	0	9
Sevenoaks	7	0	0	0	7
Folkestone and Hythe	5	1	0	0	6
Swale	7	0	0	0	7
Thanet	7	0	1	0	8
Tonbridge and Malling	6	1	0	0	7
Tunbridge Wells	6	0	0	0	6
Total	74	7	2	1	84
Net Change	+17	-18	+1	+1	

Asterisks denote incumbent councillors seeking re-election.

=== Ashford ===
There are seven single-member constituencies within the borough of Ashford. Below are the results:

Ashford Central
Party	Candidate	Votes	%	±%
Conservative	Elizabeth Tweed*	2,043	54	+11
Liberal Democrats	John B Hawes	698	18	+1
Green	Steven R Campkin	589	15	+11
Labour	Sophie E Griffiths	488	13	−21
Majority		1,345	36	
Turnout		3,818	33	−30
Conservative hold		Swing		

Ashford East
Party	Candidate	Votes	%	±%
Liberal Democrats	George Koowaree*	2,343	56	+19
Conservative	Ian R Cooling	1,419	34	+3
Labour	Brendan T Naughton	400	10	−15
Majority		924	22	
Turnout		4,162	35	−27
Liberal Democrats hold		Swing		

Ashford Rural East
Party	Candidate	Votes	%	±%
Conservative	Andrew Wickham	2,871	58	+6
Green	Lola M Sansom	886	18	+6
Liberal Democrats	Nathan G Parrett	822	17	−11
Labour	Brendan Chilton	363	7	N/A
Majority		1,985	40	
Turnout		4,942	42	−27
Conservative hold		Swing		

Ashford Rural South
Party	Candidate	Votes	%	±%
Conservative	Michael Angell*	2,509	57	+10
Liberal Democrats	Ian Stone	873	20	−6
Green	Tracy A Dighton-Brown	626	14	N/A
Labour	Vivien Wheatley	406	9	N/A
Majority		1,636	37	
Turnout		4,414	37	−27
Conservative hold		Swing		

Ashford Rural West
Party	Candidate	Votes	%	±%
Conservative	Richard King*	3,843	65	+10
Green	Hilary Jones	833	14	+8
Liberal Democrats	Stuart J Dove	824	14	−8
Labour	Christopher R Clark	406	7	−9
Majority		3,010	51	
Turnout		5,906	41	−27
Conservative hold		Swing		

Ashford South
Party	Candidate	Votes	%	±%
Conservative	Jim Wedgebury	1,236	34	+7
Labour	Derek Smyth*	946	26	+16
Liberal Democrats	Jeremy P Adby	767	21	+2
BNP	Karl J Rouse	396	11	N/A
Green	Sharon P Harvey	261	7	+2
Majority		290	8	
Turnout		3,606	31	−24
Conservative gain from Labour		Swing		

Tenterden
Party	Candidate	Votes	%	±%
Conservative	Mike Hill*	3,461	70	+6
Liberal Democrats	Barry F Wright	1,093	22	−14
Labour	Doreen J Wilcockson	393	8	N/A
Majority		2,398	48	
Turnout		4,947	42	−26
Conservative hold		Swing		

=== Canterbury ===
There are five single-member and two multi-member constituencies within the City of Canterbury, which elect a total of nine councilors to Kent County Council. Below are the results:

Canterbury City North East
Party	Candidate	Votes	%	±%
Conservative	Graham Gibbens*	1,625	45	+7
Liberal Democrats	Jo Calvert-Mindell	1,191	33	+8
Green	Geoffery J Meaden	436	12	+4
Labour	Alan Baldock	351	10	−18
Majority		434	12	
Turnout		3,603	37	−22
Conservative hold		Swing		

Canterbury City South West
Party	Candidate	Votes	%	±%
Liberal Democrats	Martin Vye*	2,263	49	+9
Conservative	Maureen M C Robinson	1,255	27	−1
Green	Elaine Godden	673	15	+8
Labour	Jean Elizabeth Butcher	391	9	−16
Majority		1008	22	
Turnout		4,582	38	−24
Liberal Democrats hold		Swing		

Canterbury South East
Party	Candidate	Votes	%	±%
Conservative	Michael Northey*	2,458	46	+2
Liberal Democrats	Nigel P Whitburn	1,804	34	+3
Green	Judith A Meaden	687	13	+5
Labour	David T McLellan	356	7	−10
Majority		654	12	
Turnout		5,305	44	−25
Conservative hold		Swing		

Canterbury West
Party	Candidate	Votes	%	±%
Conservative	John Simmonds*	2,119	50	+7
Liberal Democrats	Derek S Maslin	988	23	−6
Green	Norman S Evans	743	18	+11
Labour	Ian Leslie	387	9	−11
Majority		1,131	27	
Turnout		4,237	36	−24
Conservative hold		Swing		

Herne and Sturry
Party	Candidate	Votes	%	±%
Conservative	Alan Marsh*	2,083	47	+4
UKIP	John D Moore	1,095	24	+18
Liberal Democrats	Monica Eden-Green	826	18	−8
Labour	Cecile M Manning	472	11	−15
Majority		988	23	
Turnout		4,476	35	−30
Conservative hold		Swing		

Herne Bay (2 Seats)
Party	Candidate	Votes	%	±%
Conservative	Jean Law	2,902	19	−1
Conservative	David Hirst*	2,805	19	−1
Liberal Democrats	Margaret Flaherty	2,190	15	−3
Liberal Democrats	June Raybaud	1,862	12	−3
UKIP	Ronald W Garretty	1,614	11	+7
UKIP	Brian E MacDowall	1,419	9	N/A
Labour	Michael K Britton	670	4	−8
Green	Aaron L Kiely	592	4	N/A
BNP	William A Hitches	472	3	N/A
Labour	Norman G Price	470	3	−8
Majority		615	-4	
Turnout		14,996	36	tbc
Conservative hold		Swing		
Conservative hold		Swing		

Whitstable (2 Seats)
Party	Candidate	Votes	%	±%
Conservative	Mark Dance*	4,905	26	+2
Conservative	Michael Harrison*	4,826	25	+2
Liberal Democrats	Donna Dwight	2,118	11	+1
Green	Jolyon L Trimingham	2,072	11	+7
Liberal Democrats	David J Mummery	1,876	10	+1
Labour	Phil Cartwright	1,365	7	−6
Labour	Ben Furber	1,247	7	−5
Money Reform	Anne Belsey	523	3	N/A
Majority		2,708	14	
Turnout		18,932	40	tbc
Conservative hold		Swing		
Conservative hold		Swing		

=== Dartford ===
There are six single-member constituencies within the borough of Dartford. Below are the results

Dartford East
Party	Candidate	Votes	%	±%
Conservative	Penny Cole	1,221	38	+4
Labour	Christine Angell*	830	26	−26
English Democrat	Tony Wilson	787	24	+16
Liberal Democrats	Simon Simeonides	395	12	
Majority		391	12	
Turnout		3,233	34	−26
Conservative gain from Labour		Swing		

Dartford North East
Party	Candidate	Votes	%	±%
Conservative	Avtar Sandhu	1,140	30	+5
Labour	John I Muckle*	1,080	29	−23
English Democrat	Mike Tibby	809	21	N/A
Liberal Democrats	Adam D Jarvis	392	10	−4
BNP	Barry Taylor	346	10	N/A
Majority		60	1	
Turnout		3,767	34	−22
Conservative gain from Labour		Swing		

Dartford Rural
Party	Candidate	Votes	%	±%
Conservative	Jeremy Kite	2,780	56	+1
English Democrat	Gary Rogers	1,020	20	+15
Labour	Garry G Sturley	604	12	−24
Liberal Democrats	George Sakellariou	451	9	N/A
Peace	Geoffrey P Pay	139	3	−1
Majority		1,760	36	
Turnout		4,994	40	−26
Conservative hold		Swing		

Dartford West
Party	Candidate	Votes	%	±%
Conservative	Jan Ozog	1,873	49	−16
English Democrat	Jo Shippam	1,263	33	N/A
Liberal Democrats	Joanne S Howard	698	18	−5
Majority		610	16	
Turnout		3,834	39	−27
Conservative hold		Swing		

Swanscombe and Greenhithe
Party	Candidate	Votes	%	±%
Residents	Richard Lees	1,204	37	N/A
Conservative	Sheila East	858	26	−1
Labour	Val Ashenden	405	12	−26
BNP	Clive Cook	344	11	N/A
English Democrat	Jim Read	275	8	N/A
Liberal Democrats	James Willis	186	6	N/A
Majority		346		
Turnout		3,272	30	−26
Residents gain from Labour		Swing		

Wilmington
Party	Candidate	Votes	%	±%
Conservative	Ann Allen	2,817	56	+5
English Democrat	John Griffiths	1,258	25	+21
Labour	Patrick Kelly	980	19	−20
Majority		1,559	31	
Turnout		5,055	39	−27
Conservative hold		Swing		

=== Dover ===
There are three single-member and two multi-member constituencies within the District of Dover, which elect a total of seven councillors to Kent County Council. Below are the results:

Deal (2 Seats)
Party	Candidate	Votes	%	±%
Conservative	Julie Rook	3,914	22	+4
Conservative	Kit Smith	3,660	21	+5
Liberal Democrats	Anthony J Hook	2,592	15	+5
Liberal Democrats	John C Trickey	2,521	14	+5
Labour	Terence J Birkett*	2,420	14	−8
Labour	Michael R Eddy*	2,342	13	−8
Majority		1,068	6	
Turnout		17,449	41	
Conservative gain from Labour		Swing		
Conservative gain from Labour		Swing		

Dover North
Party	Candidate	Votes	%	±%
Conservative	Stephen Manion	2,380	43	+3
Labour	Eileen Rowbotham*	1,300	24	−18
Independent	Reginald V Hansell	1,053	19	N/A
Liberal Democrats	Sheila J Smith	764	14	−5
Majority		1,080	19	
Turnout		5,497	44	−27
Conservative gain from Labour		Swing		

Dover Town (2 Seats)
Party	Candidate	Votes	%	±%
Conservative	Nigel Collor	2,825	23	+8
Conservative	Roger Frayne	2,590	21	+8
Labour	William V Newman*	1,894	15	−11
Labour	Gordon Cowan	1,781	14	−11
Liberal Democrats	John B Mackie	1,732	14	+4
Liberal Democrats	Dean M Stiles	1,691	14	+3
Majority		696	6	
Turnout		12,513	32	
Conservative gain from Labour		Swing		
Conservative gain from Labour		Swing		

Dover West
Party	Candidate	Votes	%	±%
Conservative	Bryan Cope*	2,463	45	+1
UKIP	John Buckley	1,352	25	+22
Liberal Democrats	Peter A Lodge	1,008	18	0
Labour	Pamela M Brivio	645	12	−18
Majority		1,111	20	
Turnout		5,468	42	−31
Conservative hold		Swing		

Sandwich
Party	Candidate	Votes	%	±%
Conservative	Leyland Ridings*	3,038	57	+13
Liberal Democrats	Bryan A C Curtis	1,542	29	+6
Labour	Iain M Fairweather	728	14	−15
Majority		1,496	28	
Turnout		5,308	40	−31
Conservative hold		Swing		

=== Gravesham ===
There is a single-member and two multi-member constituencies within the Borough of Gravesham, which elect a total of five councillors to Kent County Council. Below are the results:

Gravesham East (2 Seats)
Party	Candidate	Votes	%	±%
Conservative	John Cubitt	3,713	22	+2
Conservative	Bryan Sweetland	3,343	20	+2
Labour	Jane Cribbon*	2,321	14	−9
Labour	John P Burden	2,296	13	−9
English Democrat	Elizabeth A Painter	1,425	8	N/A
Green	Richard Crawford	1,236	7	+3
Liberal Democrats	Martin Wilson	1,010	6	0
Independent	Larry Cotton	899	5	N/A
Liberal Democrats	Bruce E Parmenter	873	5	−1
Majority		1,025	6	
Turnout		17,116	34	
Conservative gain from Labour		Swing		
Conservative gain from Labour		Swing		

Gravesham Rural
Party	Candidate	Votes	%	±%
Conservative	Michael Snelling*	4,109	60	0
English Democrat	Steven A Foreman	740	11	N/A
Green	Ros Wakeman	722	11	+6
Labour	Douglas C Christie	652	10	−13
Liberal Democrats	Ann O'Brien	624	9	−2
Majority		3,369	49	
Turnout		6,847	43	−31
Conservative hold		Swing		

Northfleet and Gravesend West (2 Seats)
Party	Candidate	Votes	%	±%
Labour	Leslie Christie*	3,317	19	−5
Conservative	Harold Craske	3,174	19	−1
Labour	Ray Parker*	3,144	18	−6
Conservative	David H Turner	2,790	16	−2
Liberal Democrats	Ian Stevenson	1,208	7	0
English Democrat	Lisa Foreman	1,178	7	N/A
Green	Nigel J Rumsey	1,171	7	N/A
Liberal Democrats	Gill McGill	1,118	7	0
Majority		30	1	
Turnout		17,100	35	
Conservative gain from Labour		Swing		
Labour hold		Swing		

=== Maidstone ===
There are seven single-member and one multi-member constituencies within the Borough of Maidstone, which elect a total of nine councillors to Kent County Council. Below are the results:

Maidstone Central (2 seats)
Party	Candidate	Votes	%	±%
Liberal Democrats	Dan Daley*	4,465	26	+4
Liberal Democrats	Malcolm Robertson	3,749	22	+7
Conservative	Jeff Curwood*	2,507	14	−2
Conservative	Paul F Butcher	2,479	14	−1
UKIP	John C Stanford	1,274	7	+4
Green	Stuart R Jeffery	980	6	+1
Green	Wendy K Lewis	761	4	N/A
Labour	Bruce H Heald	603	3	−10
Labour	Marianna Romeojuliet Poliszczuk	568	3	−8
Majority		1,242	8	
Turnout		17,386	32	
Liberal Democrats gain from Conservative		Swing		
Liberal Democrats hold		Swing		

Maidstone North East
Party	Candidate	Votes	%	±%
Liberal Democrats	Ian Chittenden	2,306	53	+9
Conservative	Jeff Tree	1,159	26	−4
UKIP	Charles R Elliott	656	15	+11
Green	Derek R Eagle	260	6	+2
Majority		1,147	27	
Turnout		4,381	36	−28
Liberal Democrats hold		Swing		

Maidstone Rural East
Party	Candidate	Votes	%	±%
Conservative	Jenny Whittle	3,963	74	+11
Liberal Democrats	David S Naghi	925	17	+3
Labour	Steve Gibson	479	9	−8
Majority		3,038	57	
Turnout		5,367	42	−27
Conservative hold		Swing		

Maidstone Rural North
Party	Candidate	Votes	%	±%
Conservative	Paul Carter*	3,078	58	+9
UKIP	Gareth A Kendall	818	15	N/A
Liberal Democrats	Kenneth W Stevens	668	13	−11
Labour	Jeanne M Gibson	397	7	−14
Green	Ian F S McDonald	352	7	+3
Majority		2,260	43	
Turnout		5,313	38	−33
Conservative hold		Swing		

Maidstone Rural South
Party	Candidate	Votes	%	±%
Conservative	Eric Hotson*	2,595	62	+8
Liberal Democrats	Hugh A Laing	1,027	25	−3
Green	Robin J Kinrade	554	13	N/A
Majority		1,568	37	
Turnout		4,176	40	−28
Conservative hold		Swing		

Maidstone Rural West
Party	Candidate	Votes	%	±%
Conservative	Paulina Stockell*	2,559	46	−1
Liberal Democrats	Brian R E Mortimer	1,467	26	−4
UKIP	Keith C Woollven	825	15	N/A
Green	Sandra McDowell	397	7	+1
Labour	Edith M Davis	300	5	−13
Majority		1,092	20	
Turnout		5,548	42	−27
Conservative hold		Swing		

Maidstone South
Party	Candidate	Votes	%	±%
Conservative	Alan Chell*	1,897	44	+7
Liberal Democrats	Clive A English	1,222	29	−1
Labour Co-op	Richard J Coates	341	8	−18
Green	Stephen F Muggeridge	305	7	+4
Independent	Sheena Williams	282	7	N/A
National Front	Gary Butler	231	5.4	N/A
Majority		675	15	
Turnout		4,278	35	−27
Conservative hold		Swing		

Maidstone South East
Party	Candidate	Votes	%	±%
Conservative	Gary Cooke	1,297	43	+7
UKIP	John M Botting	577	19	+14
Labour	Gillian Annan	452	15	−21
Liberal Democrats	Rob Field	422	14	−6
Green	Andrew C Waldie	159	5	+2
Independent	John Hicks	90	3	N/A
Majority		720	24	
Turnout		2,997	28	−28
Conservative gain from Labour		Swing		

=== Sevenoaks ===
There are seven single-member constituencies within the District of Sevenoaks which elect to Kent County Council. Below are the results:

Darent Valley
Party	Candidate	Votes	%	±%
Conservative	Roger Gough	2,345	50	+6
Liberal Democrats	Philip R McGarvey	946	20	−8
English Democrat	Christopher K Snape	918	19	N/A
Labour	Carol A Theobald	517	11	−12
Majority		1,399	30	
Turnout		4,726	39	−28
Conservative hold		Swing		

Sevenoaks Central
Party	Candidate	Votes	%	±%
Conservative	John London	3,273	59	+6
Liberal Democrats	John G Brigden	1,164	21	−10
Green	Stephen J Plater	545	10	N/A
Labour	Margaret R Warne	311	6	−6
English Democrat	Richard K C Snape	254	5	N/A
Majority		2,109	38	
Turnout		5,547	43	−26
Conservative hold		Swing		

Sevenoaks East
Party	Candidate	Votes	%	±%
Conservative	Nick Chard*	2,575	52	−1
Liberal Democrats	Jean M Canet	1,170	24	−8
English Democrat	Carol White	553	11	N/A
Green	Joanne Dyton	442	9	N/A
Labour	Sarah E Goodall	219	4	−11
Majority		1,405	28	
Turnout		4,959	41	−29
Conservative hold		Swing		

Sevenoaks North East
Party	Candidate	Votes	%	±%
Conservative	David Brazier	2,885	56	+5
English Democrat	Louise A Uncles	1,091	21	N/A
Liberal Democrats	Phillip N Hobson	697	13	−1
Labour	James D Weekes	518	10	−9
Majority		1,794	35	
Turnout		5,191	37	
Conservative hold		Swing		

Sevenoaks South
Party	Candidate	Votes	%	±%
Conservative	Peter Lake*	2,439	52	0
Liberal Democrats	Howard V Jennings	1,078	23	−12
Green	Francis R R Dyton	632	13	0
English Democrat	David K R Snape	566	12	N/A
Majority		1,361	29	
Turnout		4,715	41	−24
Conservative hold		Swing		

Sevenoaks West
Party	Candidate	Votes	%	±%
Conservative	Richard Parry*	2,727	55	+2
Independent	Penelope M Kift	758	15	+3
Liberal Democrats	Richard C Wassell	756	15	−5
English Democrat	James H K Snape	424	9	N/A
Labour	Kevin R Flack	252	5	−11
Majority		1,969	40	
Turnout		4,917	41	−28
Conservative hold		Swing		

Swanley
Party	Candidate	Votes	%	±%
Conservative	Robert Brookbank	1,549	43	+13
English Democrat	Steven T Uncles	833	23	N/A
Labour	Ian W Rashbrook	823	23	−11
Liberal Democrats	Alan J Bullion	428	12	−2
Majority		716	20	
Turnout		3,633	33	−25
Conservative gain from Labour		Swing		

=== Shepway ===
There are six single-member constituencies within the District of Shepway, that elect councillors to Kent County Council. The results are:

Elham Valley
Party	Candidate	Votes	%	±%
Conservative	Susan Carey*	3,519	56	−1
UKIP	Nicholas S W Jack	1,254	20	+17
Liberal Democrats	Alex McNeice	867	14	−9
Labour	Pamela J Stevens	350	6	−6
Shepway Independents	Colin D Tearle	295	5	N/A
Majority		2,265	36	
Turnout		6,285	44	−31
Conservative hold		Swing		

Folkestone North East
Party	Candidate	Votes	%	±%
Conservative	Richard Pascoe*	982	27	−11
People First Party	Brian W Copping	904	25	+6
Liberal Democrats	Thomas S McNeice	814	22	−7
UKIP	Francis J McKenna	635	17	N/A
Labour	Paul R Bingham	248	7	−7
Shepway Independents	Martin K Ross	78	2	N/A
Majority		78	2	
Turnout		3,661	34	−30
Conservative hold		Swing		

Folkestone South
Party	Candidate	Votes	%	±%
Conservative	Roland Tolputt*	1,496	43	−6
Liberal Democrats	Gary M Fuller	821	24	−3
UKIP	Terence D Kendall	794	23	N/A
Labour	Maureen Tomison	330	10	−5
Majority		675	19	
Turnout		3,441	34	27
Conservative hold		Swing		

Folkestone West
Party	Candidate	Votes	%	±%
Liberal Democrats	Tim Prater	1,456	35	+8
Conservative	Robert Howard Clegg Bliss*	1,445	35	−10
UKIP	Carol L Sacre	776	19	N/A
People First Party	Trevor J Buss	258	6	N/A
Labour	David Sandford	185	4	−9
Majority		11	0	
Turnout		4,120	38	−30
Liberal Democrats gain from Conservative		Swing		

Hythe 4 June 2009 Shepway District
Party	Candidate	Votes	%	±%
Conservative	Chris Capon*	2,771	54	−6
Liberal Democrats	Darren E Briddock	1,161	23	−4
UKIP	Barbara M Johnson	707	14	N/A
Labour	John P Haste	263	5	−5
BNP	Harry H J Williams	208	4	N/A
Majority		1,610	31	
Turnout		5,110	46	−27
Conservative hold		Swing		

Romney Marsh
Party	Candidate	Votes	%	±%
Conservative	Willie Richardson	3,107	46	−7
UKIP	John V Meek	1,573	24	N/A
Liberal Democrats	Valerie I Loseby	872	13	−12
Labour	Douglas M Suckling	446	7	−11
Independent	Wendy V Nevard	442	7	N/A
Independent	Graham F A Snell	243	4	N/A
Majority		1,534	22	
Turnout		6,683	39	−29
Conservative hold		Swing		

=== Swale ===
There are five single-member constituencies and one multi-member constituencies within the Borough of Swale, which elect a total of eight councillors to Kent County Council. Below are the results:

Faversham
Party	Candidate	Votes	%	±%
Conservative	Tom Gates*	2,412	47	0
Liberal Democrats	Stephen Rowlstone	798	16	−1
Labour	Trevor R Payne	682	13	−17
UKIP	Shirley K Allen	680	13	N/A
Green	Gary Miller	553	11	+4
Majority		1,614	31	
Turnout		5,125	37	−29
Conservative hold		Swing		

Sheerness
Party	Candidate	Votes	%	±%
Conservative	Ken Pugh	1,275	34	−1
Labour	Angela Harrison*	1,114	29	−22
BNP	Graeme W Sergeant	539	14	N/A
Independent	David P Cassidy	533	14	N/A
Liberal Democrats	Colin L Howe	330	9	−5
Majority		161	5	
Turnout		3,791	29	−29
Conservative gain from Labour		Swing		

Sheppey
Party	Candidate	Votes	%	±%
Conservative	Adrian Crowther*	1,755	41	−3
Independent	Patricia M Sandle	711	17	N/A
Labour	David T Sargent	622	15	−24
BNP	Colin McCarthy Stewart	568	13	N/A
Liberal Democrats	David J Spurling	358	8	−9
Monster Raving Loony	Mad Mike Young	252	6	N/A
Majority		1,044	24	
Turnout		4,266	30	
Conservative hold		Swing		

Swale Central (2 Seats)
Party	Candidate	Votes	%	±%
Conservative	Mike Whiting	3,982	24	+2
Conservative	Alan Willicombe	3,849	23	+6
Labour	Roger Truelove*	2,665	16	−5
Labour	Ghlin M Whelan	2,168	13	−2
Liberal Democrats	Dave Manning	1,904	11	−2
Liberal Democrats	Keith S Nevols	1,594	10	0
Monster Raving Loony	Sheikh Mihand	566	3	+2
Majority		1,184	7	
Turnout		16,728	33	
Conservative gain from Labour		Swing		
Conservative hold		Swing		

Swale East
Party	Candidate	Votes	%	±%
Conservative	Andrew Bowles*	2,402	50	0
UKIP	Sarah Larkins	738	15	N/A
Liberal Democrats	David J Evans	600	12	−9
Labour	Ken Rowles	549	11	−18
Green	Timothy R Valentine	526	11	N/A
Majority		1,664	35	
Turnout		4,815	34	−32
Conservative hold		Swing		

Swale West
Party	Candidate	Votes	%	±%
Conservative	Keith Ferrin*	2,609	56	+3
Liberal Democrats	Elvie Lowe	1,348	29	+10
Labour	Mike Baldock	700	15	−13
Majority		1,261	27	
Turnout		4,657	35	−34
Conservative hold		Swing		

=== Thanet ===
There are two single-member and three multi-member constituencies within the District of Thanet, which elect a total of eight councillors to Kent County Council. Below are the results:

Birchington and Villages
Party	Candidate	Votes	%	±%
Conservative	Charles Hibberd*	2,661	52	0
Liberal Democrats	Bill Furness	996	19	+5
English Democrat	Derek Bradley-Young	941	18	N/A
Labour	Denise P Cartwright	523	10	−17
Majority		1,665	33	
Turnout		5,121	40	−28
Conservative hold		Swing		

Broadstairs and Sir Moses Montefiore (2 Seats)
Party	Candidate	Votes	%	±%
Conservative	Robert Bayford	4,264	28	+7
Conservative	Bill Hayton*	4,027	26	+6
Liberal Democrats	Louisa J R Latham	2,041	13	+2
Labour	Michelle H Fenner	1,765	11	−4
Liberal Democrats	Michael P T Hart	1,711	11	0
Labour	Jennifer M Matterface	1,542	10	−5
Majority		1,986	13	
Turnout		15,350	36	
Conservative hold		Swing		
Conservative hold		Swing		

Margate and Cliftonville (2 Seats)
Party	Candidate	Votes	%	±%
Conservative	Chris Wells*	2,493	21	+2
Conservative	Michael Jarvis	2,404	20	+1
Labour	Clive Hart*	2,186	18	−3
Labour	Iris Johnston	2,144	18	−1
UKIP	Jeffrey Elenor	1,727	15	+12
Liberal Democrats	Kenwyn W Hando	628	5	−2
Liberal Democrats	Nigel D A Oakes	327	3	−3
Majority		218	2	
Turnout		11,909	31	
Conservative gain from Labour		Swing		
Conservative hold		Swing		

Margate West
Party	Candidate	Votes	%	±%
Conservative	Robert Burgess*	1,645	45	+4
UKIP	Roz Parker	792	22	+16
Labour	Kerry L Harker	513	14	−21
Liberal Democrats	Margaret Burns	471	13	−2
English Democrat	Rayce Knowles	247	7	N/A
Majority		853	23	
Turnout		3,668	31	−28
Conservative hold		Swing		

Ramsgate (2 Seats)
Party	Candidate	Votes	%	±%
Conservative	John Kirby	2,985	19	+5
Labour	Elizabeth Green*	2,566	16	−7
Conservative	Michael J Taylor	2,339	15	+2
UKIP	Trevor L Shonk	2,192	14	+9
Labour	Alan R Poole*	2,081	13	−7
Ramsgate First	Gerry O'Donnell	1,141	7	N/A
Liberal Democrats	Georgina R Maddox	900	6	−1
BNP	Dennis Whiting	892	6	N/A
Liberal Democrats	Richard G H Perry	815	5	−1
Majority		227	1	
Turnout		15,911	35	
Conservative gain from Labour		Swing		
Conservative hold		Swing		

=== Tonbridge and Malling ===
There are five single-member constituencies and one multi-member constituency within the District of Tonbridge and Malling, which elect a total of seven councillors to Kent County Council. Below are the results:

Malling Central
Party	Candidate	Votes	%	±%
Liberal Democrats	Trudy Dean*	2,486	56	−5
Conservative	Alice Hohler	1,122	25	−7
UKIP	Peter G Stevens	444	10	+3
Labour	David Laverty	157	4	N/A
Green	Helen J Long	114	3	N/A
English Democrat	Teresa Cannon	95	2	N/A
Majority		1,384	31	
Turnout		4,418	38	−23
Liberal Democrats hold		Swing		

Malling North
Party	Candidate	Votes	%	±%
Conservative	Sarah Hohler*	2,253	49	−7
Labour	Paul M Hickmott	1,008	22	−22
Liberal Democrats	Liz Simpson	505	11	N/A
English Democrat	Lisa Rogers	432	9	N/A
Green	Howard Porter	361	8	N/A
Majority		1,245	27	
Turnout		4,559	37	−26
Conservative hold		Swing		

Malling Rural East
Party	Candidate	Votes	%	±%
Conservative	Richard Long, TD*	2,671	58	+2
UKIP	David Waller	609	13	N/A
Liberal Democrats	Gillian Jones	550	12	−6
Green	Frances M Long	350	8	+2
Labour	Kathleen M Garlick	258	6	−14
English Democrat	Alan Woodley	194	4	N/A
Majority		2,062	45	
Turnout		4,632	38	−30
Conservative hold		Swing		

Malling Rural North East
Party	Candidate	Votes	%	±%
Conservative	Peter Homewood	3,254	57	+9
Liberal Democrats	David Lettington	1,254	22	−30
English Democrat	Terry Bilsland	434	8	N/A
Labour	Thomas R Shelley	396	7	N/A
Green	Andrea C Ralph	357	6	N/A
Majority		2,000	35	
Turnout		5,695	41	−26
Conservative gain from Liberal Democrats		Swing		

Malling West
Party	Candidate	Votes	%	±%
Conservative	Valerie Dagger*	3,126	62	+15
Liberal Democrats	James H Menzies	682	14	−3
Green	Richard P Mountford	475	9	N/A
English Democrat	Laurence Williams	442	9	N/A
Labour	Victoria Hayman	323	6	−5
Majority		2,444	48	
Turnout		5,048	43	−28
Conservative hold		Swing		

Tonbridge (2 Seats)
Party	Candidate	Votes	%	±%
Conservative	Godfrey A Horne*	4,768	26	+1
Conservative	Christopher Smith	4,222	23	0
Liberal Democrats	Euan A Munro	1,583	9	−1
Liberal Democrats	Garry C Bridge	1,496	8	−3
UKIP	Russell J Long	1,278	7	N/A
UKIP	Peter F Smith	1,088	6	N/A
Green	Hazel F Dawe	1,032	6	+3
Labour	James Parish	944	5	−8
Green	Steve M Dawe	846	5	+2
Labour	Terence Scott	760	4	−8
English Democrat	Stephen R Culliford	475	3	N/A
Majority		2,639	14	
Turnout		18,492	39	
Conservative hold		Swing		
Conservative hold		Swing		

=== Tunbridge Wells ===
There are six single-member constituencies within the Borough of Tunbridge Wells which elect six councillors to Kent County Council. Below are the results:

Cranbrook
Party	Candidate	Votes	%	±%
Conservative	Roger Manning*	3,020	66	+11
Liberal Democrats	Keith J Brown	1,249	27	+4
Labour	David Burgess	281	6	−6
Majority		1,771	39	
Turnout		4,550	41	−27
Conservative hold		Swing		

Tunbridge Wells East
Party	Candidate	Votes	%	±%
Conservative	Kevin G Lynes*	2,372	49	+9
Liberal Democrats	David J Neve	1,532	32	−5
UKIP	Eileen A Gaylor	585	12	N/A
Labour	Timothy J Rich	324	7	−11
Majority		840	17	
Turnout		4,813	38	−25
Conservative hold		Swing		

Tunbridge Wells North
Party	Candidate	Votes	%	±%
Conservative	Roy Bullock*	1,817	38	−3
Liberal Democrats	Trevor W Poile	1,664	35	+7
UKIP	Victor C Webb	683	14	N/A
Labour	Oon S Ooi	614	13	−11
Majority		153	3	
Turnout		4,778	37	−27
Conservative hold		Swing		

Tunbridge Wells Rural
Party	Candidate	Votes	%	±%
Conservative	Alex King*	3,411	64	+11
Liberal Democrats	John G Billingham	1,395	26	+3
Labour	Raymond P Moon	562	10	−8
Majority		2,016	38	
Turnout		5,368	37	−30
Conservative hold		Swing		

Tunbridge Wells South
Party	Candidate	Votes	%	±%
Conservative	James Scholes*	3,203	62	+10
Liberal Democrats	Christopher J L Skelton	1,544	30	+2
Labour	Jemima L Blackmore	438	8	−5
Majority		1,659	32	
Turnout		5,185	39	−27
Conservative hold		Swing		

Tunbridge Wells West
Party	Candidate	Votes	%	±%
Conservative	John Davies*	2,716	52	−2
Liberal Democrats	Robert J Prance	875	17	−18
UKIP	Patricia T Theophanides	646	12	N/A
Green	Brian Leslie	632	12	0
Labour	Timothy J Probert	325	6	N/A
Majority		1,841	35	
Turnout		5,194	34	−31
Conservative hold		Swing		
