= 2015 Ashford Borough Council election =

2015 English local election

Map of results of 2015 election.

The 2015 Ashford Borough Council election took place on 7 May 2015 to elect members of Ashford Borough Council in England. This was on the same day as other local elections.

== Results ==
Ashford Borough Council Election, 2015
Party	Seats	Gains	Losses	Net gain/loss	Seats %	Votes %	Votes	+/−
Conservative	34	4	0	+4	79	52	38739	
Labour	4	1	2	-1	9	20	14835	
Ashford Ind.	2	0	3	-3	7	6	4149	
UKIP	1	1	0	+1	2	10	7506	
Liberal Democrats	1	0	1	-1	2	3	2318	
Independent	1	0	0	0	0	3	2175	
Green	0	0	0	0	0	7	4875	

=== Ward by ward ===
Aylesford Green
Party	Candidate	Votes	%	±%
Labour	Kate Hooker	725	55	+18.7
Conservative	Paul Hardisty	592	44.9	+17.3
Majority		133	10	+9.8
Turnout		664	53.5	+19.2
Labour hold		Swing		

Beaver 2 seats
Party	Candidate	Votes	%	±%
Labour	Jill Britcher	817	21.1	
UKIP	Beverly Joan Murphy	812	20.9	
Conservative	Richard Harry Bunting	715	18.4	
Labour	Dylan Alexander Jones	452	16.6	
Green	Maria Ann Pizzey	195	5	
Independent	Selina Kathleen Remedios	126	3.2	
Conservative	Janet Elizabeth Rymer-Jones	423	10.9	
Green	Aniko Szocs	135	3.4	
Turnout		3868	55.94	+22.1
Labour hold		Swing		
UKIP gain from Labour		Swing		

Biddenden
Party	Candidate	Votes	%	±%
Conservative	Neil Bell	1057	72.9	−7.5
Green	Guy Pullen	391	27	+27
Majority		666	45	−15.8
Turnout		1448	71.4	+23.3
Conservative hold		Swing		

Bockhanger
Party	Candidate	Votes	%	±%
Labour	Kaprasad Chhantyal	392	33.5	+18.2
Conservative	Luke Powell	778	66.4	+15.7
Majority		386	32.9	+8.1
Turnout		1170	61.1	+16.9
Conservative hold		Swing		

Boughton Aluph & Eastwell
Party	Candidate	Votes	%	±%
Conservative	Len Bunn	465	29.3	+3.9
Ashford Ind.	Winston Russel Michael	895	56.5	+17.6
Liberal Democrats	Len Micklewright	64	4	−31.6
Labour	Ryan Bulley	158	9.9	+9.9
Majority		430	27.1	+23.8
Turnout		1582	65.5	+21.6
Ashford Ind. hold		Swing		

Bybrook
Party	Candidate	Votes	%	±%
Conservative	Andrew John Buchanan	693	55.7	+18.9
Labour	Alexander Ward	549	44.2	+44.2
Majority		144	11.5	+9.3
Turnout		1242	65.2	+23.3
Conservative hold		Swing		

Charing
Party	Candidate	Votes	%	±%
UKIP	Peter Allen	380	27.2	+27.2
Conservative	Gerry Clarkson	714	51.1	−17
Liberal Democrats	Shirley Anne Davis	303	21.6	−10.3
Majority		334	23.9	−12.4
Turnout		1397	68.7	+19.2
Conservative hold		Swing		

Downs North
Party	Candidate	Votes	%	±%
Conservative	Stephen Dehnel	932	61.5	+4.7
Labour	Cleo Lines	291	19.2	+19.2
Green	Marilyn Sansom	290	19.1	+3.2
Majority		641	29.5	0
Turnout		1513	75.5	+23
Conservative hold		Swing		

Downs West
Party	Candidate	Votes	%	±%
Conservative	Larry William Krause	893	67.4	+18.4
Green	Tom Medhurst	431	32.5	+20.4
Majority		462	34.8	+15.9
Turnout		1324	67.7	+15.2
Conservative hold		Swing		

Godinton 2 seats
Party	Candidate	Votes	%	±%
UKIP	Dave Botting	653	11.1	
UKIP	Jenny Botting	612	10.4	
Conservative	Peter Feacey	1436	24.5	
Ashford Ind.	Kenneth George Edward Frohnsdorff	155	2.6	
Liberal Democrats	Adrian John Gee-Turner	312	5.3	
Conservative	Bernard Heyes	1292	22	
Labour	Alexander Oluwole Jaiyesimi	570	9.7	
Green	Jake Adam Pentland	334	5.7	
Labour	Chandrawati Rai	490	8.3	
Turnout		5854	65.6	+26
Conservative hold		Swing		
Conservative hold		Swing		

Great Chart and Singleton North
Party	Candidate	Votes	%	±%
Conservative	Jessamy Edmee Blanford	782	43.6	+1.4
Ashford Ind.	John Hugh Durrant	336	18.7	−21.2
UKIP	Matt Peach	358	19.9	+19.9
Labour	Waheed Qureshi	315	17.5	−0.4
Majority		424	23.6	+21.3
Turnout		1791	66.5	+28.2
Conservative hold		Swing		

Highfield
Party	Candidate	Votes	%	±%
Ashford Ind.	Jane Davey	391	29.1	−15.3
Green	Charmaine Elizabeth Perrin	135	10	+10
	Dawa Wangdi Sherpa	221	16.4	+16.4
Conservative	Gerald White	593	44.2	+7.4
Majority		202	15	+7.3
Turnout		1340	71.4	+26.7
Conservative gain from Ashford Ind.		Swing		

Isle of Oxney
Party	Candidate	Votes	%	±%
Conservative	Mick Burgess	983	62	+62
Green	David Ledger	213	13.4	+13.4
UKIP	Kate Manning	389	24.5	+24.5
Majority		594	37.4	+37.4
Turnout		1585	72.3	+72.3
Conservative hold		Swing		

Kennington
Party	Candidate	Votes	%	±%
Liberal Democrats	Ken Blanshard	133	9.4	+9.4
UKIP	Pat Purnell	212	14.9	+14.9
Conservative	Philip John Frederick Sims	684	48.2	+5.1
Ashford Ind.	Derek William Standing	213	15	−30.7
Labour	Andrew Stevenson	177	12.5	+1.4
Majority		471	33.1	+30.5
Turnout		1419	76	22
Conservative gain from Ashford Ind.		Swing		

Little Burton Farm
Party	Candidate	Votes	%	±%
UKIP	Bev Gregory	321	21	+21
Liberal Democrats	Clare Hardwick	128	8.3	−11
Conservative	Marion Martin	747	48.9	−1.1
Labour	Grace Emily O'Driscoll	331	21.6	+7.9
Majority		416	27.2	−3.5
Turnout		1419	69	+22.8
Conservative hold		Swing		

Norman
Party	Candidate	Votes	%	±%
Labour	Gordon Miller	506	44	+13.5
Conservative	Jenny Webb	643	55.9	+28.4
Majority		137	11.9	+8.9
Turnout		1149	57.7	+20.4
Conservative gain from Labour		Swing		

North Willesborough 2 seats
Party	Candidate	Votes	%	±%
Conservative	Jeremy Paul Adby	1019	22.5	
Green	Steve Robert Campkin	406	8.9	
Liberal Democrats	George Koowaree	1147	25.4	
Labour	Dhan Ragu	565	12.5	
Independent	Andrew Martin William Mortimer	436	9.6	
Labour	Elizabeth Mylonogianni	623	13.8	
Conservative	Ian Andrew Price	317	7	
Turnout		4513	68.6	+21.9
Liberal Democrats hold		Swing		
Conservative gain from Ashford Ind.		Swing		

Park Farm North
Party	Candidate	Votes	%	±%
Labour	Sean Davidson	328	19.5	−2.1
Conservative	Tina Heyes	821	48.8	−5.6
Independent	John Holland	193	11.4	+11.4
UKIP	Jim Lucy	337	20	+20
Majority		484	28.8	−4.1
Turnout		1679	67	+26
Conservative hold		Swing		

Park Farm South
Party	Candidate	Votes	%	±%
Labour	Amy Mitchell	436	34.1	+7.5
Conservative	Jim Wedgbury	839	65.8	−7.6
Majority		403	31.6	−15.2
Turnout		1275	61.7	+29.2
Conservative hold		Swing		

Rolvenden and Tenterden West
Party	Candidate	Votes	%	±%
Conservative	Mike Bennett	Uncontested	N/A	0
Conservative hold		Swing		

Saxon Shore 2 seats
Party	Candidate	Votes	%	±%
Labour	Giri Arulampalam	453	8.3	
Ashford Ind.	Sue Davison	645	11.9	
Conservative	William Thomas Howard	2000	36.9	
Conservative	Jane Martin	1832	33.8	
Labour	Rebecca Rutter	479	8.8	
Turnout		5418	75.79	23
Conservative hold		Swing		
Conservative hold		Swing		

Singleton South
Party	Candidate	Votes	%	±%
Conservative	William Barrett	646	42.9	−3.8
Ashford Ind.	Sarah Angela Heaton Dacre	226	15	−0.2
Labour	Sally Ann Gathern	331	22	+22
UKIP	Mike Withycombe	300	19.9	+19.9
Majority		315	20.9	+2.9
Turnout		1503	63.2	+25.7
Conservative hold		Swing		

South Willesborough
Party	Candidate	Votes	%	±%
Green	Joanna Baker	96	6.5	+6.5
Labour	Martin Chandler	303	20.5	+2.3
Conservative	Sara-Jane Martin	297	20.1	+2.1
Independent	David Owen Smith	520	35.2	−28.6
UKIP	Mike Sykes	248	16.8	+16.8
Majority		217	14.7	−30.9
Turnout		1474	57.2	+11.6
Independent hold		Swing		

St Michaels
Party	Candidate	Votes	%	±%
Conservative	John Link	893	75.5	+4.4
Green	Matthew Stanley	291	24.6	+3.4
Majority		600	50.7	+1
Turnout		1182	63.8	+16.9
Conservative hold		Swing		

Stanhope
Party	Candidate	Votes	%	±%
UKIP	Eddy Barrows	245	25.2	+25.2
Labour	Brendan Chilton	482	49.6	−3.9
Conservative	James Charles King	185	19	+19
Green	Thom Pizzey	59	6	+6
Majority		337	34.7	+22.3
Turnout		971	45.6	+17.1
Labour hold		Swing		

Stour 2 seats
Party	Candidate	Votes	%	±%
Labour	Euan Fergus Anckorn	739	18.6	
Conservative	Graham Galpin	1298	32.6	
Green	Peter David Morgan	478	12	
Labour	Charles Suddards	594	14.9	
Conservative	Chris Waters	863	14.9	
Turnout		3972	63.7	+22.3
Conservative hold		Swing		
Conservative hold		Swing		

Tenterden North
Party	Candidate	Votes	%	±%
Liberal Democrats	Steve Bowen	160	11.2	+11.2
Conservative	Paul Clokie	827	58.1	+8
Ashford Ind.	Roy Anthony Isworth	248	17.4	+17.4
Labour	David Joh Ward	186	13	+1.1
Majority		579	40.7	+14.6
Turnout		1421	77.4	+65.5
Conservative hold		Swing		

Tenterden South
Party	Candidate	Votes	%	±%
UKIP	Lynn Brodlie	270	19.3	+19.3
Labour	Demi Chilton	179	12.8	+12.8
Conservative	Callum Knowles	946	67.8	+9
Majority		676	48.4	+31.1
Turnout		1359	70.9	+22.3
Conservative hold		Swing		

Victoria 2 seats
Party	Candidate	Votes	%	±%
Conservative	Harold Apps	674	16.7	
UKIP	Neil Burgess	640	15.8	
UKIP	Elaine Evans	479	11.8	
Labour	Dara Farrell	721	17.8	
Labour	Caroline Jean Harris	636	15.7	
Conservative	Shafi Khan	549	13.6	
Green	Claire Madeleine	332	8.2	
Turnout		4031	57.1	+20.2
Labour gain from Liberal Democrats		Swing		
Conservative hold		Swing		

Washford
Party	Candidate	Votes	%	±%
Ashford Ind.	Tony Francis	389	25.2	+12.9
Labour	Sue Riley-Nevers	379	24.6	+3.5
Conservative	Neil James Shorter	772	50.1	+12.4
Majority		383	40.7	+32
Turnout		1540	62.1	+25.8
Conservative hold		Swing		

Weald Central 2 seats
Party	Candidate	Votes	%	±%
Conservative	Clair Louise Bell	1660	33	
Independent	Keith William Brannan	679	13.5	
Labour	Dion Chilton	288	5.7	
Labour	June Graham	264	5.2	
UKIP	Martin Oldaker	791	15.7	
Conservative	Alan Michael Pickering	1347	26.7	
Turnout		5029	72.22	
Conservative hold		Swing		
Conservative hold		Swing		

Weald East
Party	Candidate	Votes	%	±%
Conservative	Paul William Bartlett	1140	74.6	
Green	Geoff Meaden	388	25.3	
Majority		752	49.2	
Turnout		1528	70.6	
Conservative hold		Swing		

Weald North
Party	Candidate	Votes	%	±%
Conservative	Geraldine Averil Dyer	968	65.7	
UKIP	Mark H D Hudson	333	22.2	
Green	Hilary Jones	194	12.9	
Majority		1162	77.7	
Turnout		1495	76.6	
Conservative hold		Swing		

Weald South 2 seats
Party	Candidate	Votes	%	±%
Conservative	Brad Bradford	1969	36	
Conservative	Aline Kathleen Hicks	2053	37.5	
Labour	Viven Wheatley	587	10.7	
Green	Liz Wright	507	9.2	
Labour	Arthur Young	347	6.3	
Turnout		5463	73.47	
Conservative gain from Ashford Ind.		Swing		
Conservative hold		Swing		

Wye
Party	Candidate	Votes	%	±%
Labour	Jayne Chilton	142	10.2	
Liberal Democrats	Stuart James Dove	71	5.1	
Conservative	Alex Howard	402	28.8	
UKIP	Alan William Edward Newill	126	9	
Ashford Ind.	Noel Ovenden	651	46.7	
Majority		249	17.8	
Turnout		1392	74.9	
Ashford Ind. hold		Swing		
