= 2005 Kent County Council election =

2005 UK local government election

- 5 May 2005

All 84 seats to Kent County Council 43 seats needed for a majority
	First party	Second party	Third party
Leader	Sandy Bruce-Lockhart
Party	Conservative	Labour	Liberal Democrats
Seats won	57	21	6
Seat change	▲5	▼1	▼4
Leader before election
Sandy Bruce-Lockhart
Conservative
Elected Leader
Sandy Bruce-Lockhart
Conservative

Kent County Council held its elections on 5 May 2005, on the same day as the 2005 United Kingdom general election. They were followed by the 2009 Kent County Council election.

Elections were held in all divisions across Kent, excepting Medway Towns which is a unitary authority.

== Summary of 2005 results ==
Elections were held in 2005 across Kent.

Summary of results
Party	Ashford	Canterbury	Dartford	Dover	Gravesham	Maidstone	Sevenoaks	Shepway	Swale	Thanet	Tonbridge and Malling	Tunbridge Wells	Total
Conservative	5	8	2	2	1	6	6	6	5	4	5	7	57
Labour	1	0	4	5	4	1	1	0	2	3	0	0	21
Liberal Democrats	1	1	0	0	0	2	0	0	0	0	2	0	6
