= Paul Carter (politician) =

British politician

Sir Paul Benedict Crossland Carter CBE is a British Conservative local government politician, serving as a councillor in Kent County Council, which he led for 14 years from 2005 until the end of 2019, and as the chair of the County Councils Network special-interest group within the Local Government Association from 2015 until 2020.

Carter was appointed Commander of the Order of the British Empire (CBE) in the 2014 New Year Honours. He was knighted in the 2020 Birthday Honours for services to local government.

== Offices held ==
Political offices
Preceded by Sandy Bruce-Lockhart	Leader of Kent County Council; 2005–2019	Succeeded by Roger Gough
Preceded by Unknown	Chair, County Councils Network, Local Government Association; 2015–2020	Succeeded by Unknown
