= 1999 Ashford Borough Council election =

1999 UK local government election

The 1999 Ashford Borough Council election took place on 6 May 1999 to elect members of Ashford Borough Council in Kent, England. The whole council was up for election and the council stayed under no overall control.

== Background ==
The previous election in 1995 saw the Conservative party lose control of the council. Going into 1999 the council was seen as one of the Conservatives top targets with the party needing a 6% swing to take control.

== Election result ==
The results saw the Conservatives make 5 gains but fail to win a majority on the council.

Ashford local election result 1999
Party	Seats	Gains	Losses	Net gain/loss	Seats %	Votes %	Votes	+/−
Conservative	24			+5	49.0			
Labour	11			-2	22.4			
Liberal Democrats	10			-4	20.4			
Independent	4			+3	8.2			
Others	0			-2	0			
