= Harriet Yeo =

British trade unionist and politician

Harriet Bronwen Yeo is a British trade unionist, a former Treasurer and President of Transport Salaried Staffs' Association (TSSA), and a UK Independence Party (UKIP) politician who stood unsuccessfully for parliament in Folkestone and Hythe at the 2015 general election.

== Biography ==
Formerly a Labour politician, she was a member of the National Executive Committee of the Labour Party until September 2013, and was national Chair of the Party for the year 2012–2013. She was a councillor in Ashford Borough Council, Kent, where she was Leader of the Labour Group until February 2015. In 2012 she stood as Labour candidate for Police and crime commissioner for Kent.

Yeo was deselected as a Labour candidate for the 2015 local elections and left to join UKIP the next day. She was also replaced as leader of Ashford Council's Labour group, after being accused of non-attendance at council meetings and a failure undertake council casework.

=== Joining UKIP ===
In February 2015, she left the Labour Party, blaming Ed Miliband's refusal to promise an EU In/Out Referendum, and announced support for the UK Independence Party (UKIP) without becoming a member of UKIP, sitting as an independent councillor. Her daughter had also left Labour to stand for UKIP in the 2013 Kent County Council elections for the Ashford South division, an election where Harriet Yeo had also stood for Labour unsuccessfully in the Ashford East division.

On 24 March 2015, it was announced that Yeo had joined UKIP and was to replace Janice Atkinson, UKIP's Prospective parliamentary candidate in Folkestone and Hythe, who had been removed from UKIP the day before amid an alleged expenses fraud. In the general election held on 7 May, Yeo came second in Folkestone and Hythe, losing to Damian Collins (Conservative) with 12,526 votes. Elections to Ashford Borough Council were held on the same day, but she did not stand for re-election there.

Party political offices
Preceded by Michael Cashman	Chair of the Labour Party; 2012–13	Succeeded by Angela Eagle
Trade union offices
Preceded by Andy Bain	President of the Transport Salaried Staffs' Association; 2011–2013	Succeeded by Mick Carney
