= Ashford Independents =

- Leader: Noel Ovenden
- Founded: 6 March 2003; 23 years ago
- Headquarters: Ashford, Kent
- Ideology: Localism
- Colours: Yellow-green
- Ashford Borough Council: 10 / 47

Website
- www.ashfordindependent.co.uk

The Ashford Independents are a local political party based in Ashford, Kent. The group was founded in 2003.

Currently, the Ashford Independents form the minority administration of Ashford Borough council with the Green Party.

== History ==
In the 2023 Ashford Borough council election, the party won nine seats: two less than at the previous election. Their leader, Noel Ovenden, was elected leader of the council, with the support of the Greens. This marked the first time the council hadn't been Conservative led in over 20 years.

In May 2024, an independent councillor joined the Ashford Independents, which brought their total to 10 councillors.

== Manifesto ==
The party has a manifesto, which sets out its policies for the local area:

- Low local rates
- The establishment of a further education college to improve local skills
- Improved building standards for new housing
- Opposition to large developments on greenfield land
- Providing social housing for those who need it
- Improved public transport services
