= 2023 Ashford Borough Council election =

2023 English local election

- 4 May 2023

All 47 seats to Ashford Borough Council 24 seats needed for a majority
	First party	Second party
Leader	Gerry Clarkson	Brendan Chilton
Party	Conservative	Labour
Last election	26 seats, 39.2%	7 seats, 14.9%
Seats before	23	6
Seats won	19	11
Seat change	▼7	▲4
Popular vote	14,133	9,924
Percentage	35.7%	25.1%
Swing	▼3.5%	▲9.1%
	Third party	Fourth party
Leader	Noel Ovenden	Steve Campkin & Liz Wright (Note: Co-leaders)
Party	Ashford Ind.	Green
Last election	11 seats, 19.1%	2 seats, 13.2%
Seats before	10	4
Seats won	9	8
Seat change	▼2	▲6
Popular vote	5,919	7,183
Percentage	14.9%	18.1%
Swing	▼4.2%	▲4.9%
- Winner of each seat at the 2023 Ashford Borough Council election
Leader before election
Gerry Clarkson
Conservative
No overall control
Leader after election
Noel Ovenden
Ashford Independents
No overall control

The 2023 Ashford Borough Council election took place on 4 May 2023 to elect members of Ashford Borough Council in Kent, England. This was on the same day as other local elections in England.

At the previous election in 2019, the Conservatives had held onto a majority winning 26 seats out of the 47 up for election. In the intervening years a number of by-elections and defections caused the council to go into no overall control, with the Conservatives continuing to govern as a minority administration, led by Gerry Clarkson. He chose not to stand for re-election in 2023.

The council remained under no overall control following the election. The Conservatives remained the largest party, but a coalition of the Ashford Independents and the Greens formed a minority administration, with Ashford Independent councillor Noel Ovenden being appointed leader of the council at the subsequent annual council meeting on 30 May 2023.

== Summary ==
=== Election result ===
2023 Ashford Borough Council election
Party	Candidates	Seats	Gains	Losses	Net gain/loss	Seats %	Votes %	Votes	+/−
Conservative	47	19	1	8	▼7	40.4	35.7	14,133	–3.5
Labour	47	11	4	0	▲4	23.4	25.1	9,924	+9.1
Ashford Ind.	18	9	2	4	▼2	19.1	14.9	5,919	–4.2
Green	27	8	6	0	▲6	17.0	18.1	7,183	+4.9
Independent	4	0	0	1	▼1	0.0	1.5	626	–0.1
Liberal Democrats	15	0	0	0	Steady	0.0	3.9	1,549	–2.5
Reform	1	0	0	0	Steady	0.0	0.2	90	N/A
TUSC	2	0	0	0	Steady	0.0	0.2	107	N/A

The gain and losses in the above summary results table depict the difference between the 2019 election and the 2023 election. It does not reflect changes since any by-elections in the intervening years.

== Ward results ==
The Statement of Persons Nominated, which details the candidates standing in each ward, was released by Ashford Borough Council following the close of nominations on 5 April 2023. The results in each ward were as follows: Asterisks denote incumbent councillors seeking re-election.

=== Aylesford & East Stour ===
Aylesford & East Stour
Party	Candidate	Votes	%	±%
Labour	Sojan Joseph	332	32.5	+9.6
Green	Al Arnold	297	29.0	+14.5
Labour	Reena Mathew	287	28.1	+6.7
Green	Thom Pizzey	261	25.5	+17.5
Ashford Ind.	Andy Rogers*	258	25.2	−7.8
Ashford Ind.	David Smith*	243	23.8	−14.7
Conservative	Brandon Hawkins	144	14.1	+0.5
Conservative	Joanna McCafferty	136	13.3	+2.4
Rejected ballots		4	0.4	
Majority		10	1.0	
Turnout		1,027	23.3	−1.4
Registered electors		4,417		
Labour gain from Ashford Ind.		Swing		
Green gain from Ashford Ind.		Swing		

=== Beaver ===
Beaver
Party	Candidate	Votes	%	±%
Labour	Kate Leavey	470	44.9	+5.4
Labour	Lyn Suddards*	410	39.2	−1.7
Conservative	Dhan Limbu	285	27.2	+5.7
Conservative	Neil Shorter	270	25.8	+9.2
Ashford Ind.	Phill Thorne	215	20.5	N/A
Liberal Democrats	Jacquie Stamp	99	9.5	N/A
TUSC	Garry Harrison	95	9.1	N/A
Rejected ballots		3	0.3	
Majority		125	11.9	
Turnout		1,050	22.2	+0.1
Registered electors		4,723		
Labour hold		Swing		
Labour hold		Swing		

=== Biddenden ===
Biddenden
Party	Candidate	Votes	%	±%
Conservative	Neil Bell*	552	65.8	−6.3
Green	Guy Pullen	175	20.9	−7.2
Labour	Sarah Lucas	112	13.3	N/A
Rejected ballots		6	0.7	
Majority		377	44.9	
Turnout		845	34.7	+0.1
Registered electors		2,436		
Conservative hold				

=== Bircholt ===
Bircholt
Party	Candidate	Votes	%	±%
Ashford Ind.	Simon Betty	294	31.7	N/A
Conservative	William Howard	278	30.0	+29.9
Green	Pat Marsh	132	14.3	N/A
Labour	Julie Clift	116	12.5	N/A
Independent	William Harbottle	106	11.4	N/A
Rejected ballots		2	0.2	
Majority		16	1.7	
Turnout		928	41.7	N/A
Registered electors		2,226		
Ashford Ind. gain from Conservative				

=== Bockhanger ===
Bockhanger
Party	Candidate	Votes	%	±%
Labour	Diccon Spain*	340	66.3	+16.6
Conservative	Shafi Khan	173	33.7	−5.5
Rejected ballots		4	0.8	
Majority		167	32.6	
Turnout		517	25.7	−2.1
Registered electors		2,015		
Labour hold				

=== Bybrook ===
Bybrook
Party	Candidate	Votes	%	±%
Labour	Alan Dean	261	33.6	+7.5
Conservative	Jac Wood	248	32.0	+1.9
Ashford Ind.	Howard Turner*	230	29.6	−14.3
Liberal Democrats	Andrew Graham	37	4.8	N/A
Rejected ballots		1	0.1	
Majority		13	1.7	
Turnout		777	37.7	+4.5
Registered electors		2,059		
Labour gain from Ashford Ind.				

=== Charing ===
Charing
Party	Candidate	Votes	%	±%
Conservative	Yvonne Roden	473	66.3	−6.6
Labour	Janet White	240	33.7	+4.6
Rejected ballots		14	1.9	
Majority		233	32.7	
Turnout		727	33.4	−0.6
Registered electors		2,177		
Conservative hold				

=== Conningbrook & Little Burton Farm ===
Conningbrook & Little Burton Farm
Party	Candidate	Votes	%	±%
Ashford Ind.	Katy Pauley*	272	43.8	−26.7
Conservative	John Seaton	159	25.6	−4.1
Labour	Dylan Jones	150	24.2	N/A
Liberal Democrats	Charles Knight	40	6.4	N/A
Rejected ballots		1	0.2	
Majority		113	18.2	
Turnout		622	33.0	+1.4
Registered electors		1,882		
Ashford Ind. hold				

=== Downs North ===
Downs North
Party	Candidate	Votes	%	±%
Green	Geoff Meaden*	348	40.5	+16.9
Conservative	Joseph Webb	247	28.7	−18.7
Ashford Ind.	Chris Main	188	21.9	N/A
Labour	Lisa Bouchat	51	5.9	−4.5
Liberal Democrats	Carol Wilcox	26	3.0	−15.7
Rejected ballots		0	0.0	
Majority		101	11.7	
Turnout		860	41.9	+2.4
Registered electors		2,052		
Green gain from Conservative				

=== Downs West ===
Downs West
Party	Candidate	Votes	%	±%
Conservative	Larry Krause	435	54.0	−8.5
Green	Vanessa Hutchinson	204	25.3	−3.1
Labour	Geoff White	167	20.7	+11.3
Rejected ballots		1	0.1	
Majority		231	28.7	
Turnout		807	34.3	−0.5
Registered electors		2,356		
Conservative hold				

=== Furley ===
Furley
Party	Candidate	Votes	%	±%
Labour	Euan Anckorn*	549	41.2	+7.3
Conservative	Andrew Buchanan*	506	38.0	+3.7
Labour	Sharon McCormack	475	35.6	N/A
Conservative	Trish Cornish	442	33.2	−0.6
Green	Louise Homewood	310	23.3	−5.1
Liberal Democrats	Adrian Gee-Turner	162	12.2	−6.0
Rejected ballots		8	0.6	
Majority		31	2.3	
Turnout		1,341	30.6	+0.8
Registered electors		4,383		
Labour hold		Swing		
Conservative hold		Swing		

=== Goat Lees ===
Goat Lees
Party	Candidate	Votes	%	±%
Ashford Ind.	Winston Michael*	474	76.9	−5.9
Labour	Ellie Crook	86	14.0	+6.1
Conservative	Phil Sibbald	56	9.1	−0.5
Rejected ballots		4	0.6	
Majority		388	63.0	
Turnout		620	33.3	−4.7
Registered electors		1,861		
Ashford Ind. hold				

=== Godinton ===
Godinton
Party	Candidate	Votes	%	±%
Conservative	Peter Feacey*	330	52.0	−3.6
Labour	Mark Silvester	146	23.0	+3.3
Green	Matt Baker	94	14.8	−10.0
Liberal Democrats	Charlotte Mbali	53	8.3	N/A
TUSC	Cameron Osmundsen	12	1.9	N/A
Rejected ballots		3	0.5	
Majority		184	29.0	
Turnout		638	32.8	+1.35
Registered electors		1,948		
Conservative hold				

=== Highfield ===
Highfield
Party	Candidate	Votes	%	±%
Green	Dawnie Nilsson*	464	59.0	+40.2
Conservative	Payal Khandaker	205	26.0	−15.1
Labour	David Gordon-Young	118	15.0	N/A
Rejected ballots		1	0.1	
Majority		259	32.9	
Turnout		788	38.9	+15.3
Registered electors		2,025		
Green gain from Conservative				

=== Isle of Oxney ===
Isle of Oxney
Party	Candidate	Votes	%	±%
Conservative	Johnny Shilton	439	47.3	+47.2
Ashford Ind.	Simon Honnor	318	34.2	N/A
Labour	Robert Pursey	91	9.8	N/A
Liberal Democrats	Christopher Grayling	81	8.7	N/A
Rejected ballots		2	0.2	
Majority		121	13.0	
Turnout		931	42.1	+42
Registered electors		2,212		
Conservative hold				

=== Kennington ===
Kennington
Party	Candidate	Votes	%	±%
Conservative	Nathan Iliffe*	389	55.4	−6.6
Green	Philip Sims	161	22.9	N/A
Labour	Kemar Harriot	152	21.7	N/A
Rejected ballots		2	0.3	
Majority		228	32.5	
Turnout		703	39.2	−11.4
Registered electors		1,795		
Conservative hold				

=== Kingsnorth Village & Bridgefield ===
Kingsnorth Village & Bridgefield
Party	Candidate	Votes	%	±%
Ashford Ind.	Ray Mcgeever	273	46.8	+15%
Conservative	David Robey	170	29.2	−1.8
Labour	Kathy Walters	140	24.0	N/A
Rejected ballots		1	0.2	
Majority		103	17.7	
Turnout		584	26.9	−2.4
Registered electors		2,172		
Ashford Ind. hold				

=== Mersham, Sevington South with Finberry ===
Mersham, Sevington South with Finberry
Party	Candidate	Votes	%	±%
Conservative	Paul Bartlett*	365	56.4	+56.4
Green	Anne Mildon	169	26.1	N/A
Labour	Chris Kennedy	113	17.5	N/A
Rejected ballots		2	0.3	
Majority		196	30.3	
Turnout		649	30.7	+30.7
Registered electors		2,113		
Conservative hold				

=== Norman ===
Norman
Party	Candidate	Votes	%	±%
Green	Jo Gambling	161	27.7	+14.6
Labour	Dara Farrell	156	26.8	−4.4
Conservative	Mark Starkings	149	25.6	−8.6
Independent	Jenny Webb	116	19.9	−14.3
Rejected ballots		1	0.2	
Majority		5	0.9	
Turnout		583	28.3	−1.7
Registered electors		2,057		
Green gain from Conservative				

=== Park Farm North ===
Park Farm North
Party	Candidate	Votes	%	±%
Ashford Ind.	Ben Townend	178	35.8	N/A
Conservative	Biswasdip Limbu	168	33.8	−27.7
Labour	Terry Jones	151	30.4	+10.4
Rejected ballots		1	0.2	
Majority		10	2.0	
Turnout		498	26.6	+4.4
Registered electors		1,874		
Ashford Ind. hold				

=== Park Farm South ===
Park Farm South
Party	Candidate	Votes	%	±%
Green	Katrina Giles	239	41.2	N/A
Conservative	Jim Wedgbury	227	39.1	−22.0
Labour	Aimee Babbs	114	19.7	−2.0
Rejected ballots		1	0.2	
Majority		12	2.1	
Turnout		581	31.0	+4.8
Registered electors		1,873		
Green gain from Conservative				

=== Repton ===
Repton
Party	Candidate	Votes	%	±%
Conservative	Matthew Forest	405	48.2	−7.6
Conservative	Bernard Heyes	337	40.1	−6.7
Labour	Elizampeth Mylonogianni	323	38.4	+8.1
Labour	Priti Paintal	307	36.5	N/A
Green	Dave Higgins	138	16.4	−13.5
Green	Jake Pentland	128	15.2	N/A
Rejected ballots		6	0.7	
Majority		14	1.7	
Turnout		847	25.7	+0.3
Registered electors		3,292		
Conservative hold		Swing		
Conservative hold		Swing		

=== Rolvenden & Tenterden West ===
Rolvenden & Tenterden West
Party	Candidate	Votes	%	±%
Green	Kate Walder*	444	53.4	N/A
Conservative	Tom Spiller	317	38.1	−0.7
Labour	Amber Wardrop	70	8.4	N/A
Rejected ballots		9	1.1	
Majority		127	15.3	
Turnout		840	42.0	−4.8
Registered electors		2,000		
Green gain from Independent		Swing		

=== Roman ===
Roman
Party	Candidate	Votes	%	±%
Ashford Ind.	Heather Hayward*	374	62.8	+3.6
Conservative	John Bentley	123	20.6	−10.6
Labour	Terry Pavlou	99	16.6	+6.9
Rejected ballots		1	0.2	
Majority		251	42.1	
Turnout		597	27.7	−1.5
Registered electors		2,156		
Ashford Ind. hold				

=== Saxon Shore ===
Saxon Shore
Party	Candidate	Votes	%	±%
Ashford Ind.	Linda Harman*	593	72.2	+15.9
Conservative	Laura Robinson	158	19.2	−24.5
Labour	Dave Gathern	70	8.5	N/A
Rejected ballots		2	0.2	
Majority		435	53.0	
Turnout		823	39.4	−6.8
Registered electors		2,089		
Ashford Ind. hold				

=== Singleton East ===
Singleton East
Party	Candidate	Votes	%	±%
Conservative	Bill Barrett*	164	34.8	−7.5
Labour	Lydia Shomuyiwa	146	31.0	+2.8
Ashford Ind.	Malcolm Wiffen	91	19.3	N/A
Green	Andy Whybrow	43	9.1	−10.2
Liberal Democrats	Robin Robinson	27	5.7	−4.6
Rejected ballots		0	0.0	
Majority		18	3.8	
Turnout		471	26.3	−0.7
Registered electors		1,793		
Conservative hold				

=== Singleton West ===
Singleton West
Party	Candidate	Votes	%	±%
Labour	Sally Gathern	277	54.6	+17.1
Conservative	Kalysha Howard-Smith	160	31.6	−10.7
Liberal Democrats	Paul Thornton-Allan	70	13.8	−6.5
Rejected ballots		6	1.2	
Majority		117	23.1	
Turnout		513	25.8	+1.9
Registered electors		1,991		
Labour gain from Conservative				

=== Stanhope ===
Stanhope
Party	Candidate	Votes	%	±%
Labour	Brendan Chilton*	215	77.6	+10.5
Green	Maria Pizzey	34	12.3	−2.4
Conservative	Sarah Claydon	28	10.1	−8.2
Rejected ballots		4	1.4	
Majority		181	65.3	
Turnout		280	14.9	−5.5
Registered electors		1,881		
Labour hold				

=== Tenterden North ===
Tenterden North
Party	Candidate	Votes	%	±%
Conservative	Ken Mulholland	415	51.6	−21
Labour	David Ward	202	25.1	−2.5
Liberal Democrats	Stephen Bowen	118	14.7	N/A
Green	Owen Elias	70	8.7	N/A
Rejected ballots		4	0.5	
Majority		213	26.5	
Turnout		809	40.4	+0.2
Registered electors		2,001		
Conservative hold				

=== Tenterden South ===
Tenterden South
Party	Candidate	Votes	%	±%
Conservative	Pam Smith	341	46.1	+46.0
Independent	John Crawford	249	33.6	N/A
Labour	Emma Maclennan	150	20.3	N/A
Rejected ballots		3	0.4	
Majority		92	12.4	
Turnout		743	35.2	+35.2
Registered electors		2,111		
Conservative hold				

=== Tenterden St Michael's ===
Tenterden St Michael's
Party	Candidate	Votes	%	±%
Conservative	John Link*	342	47.8	+47.7
Liberal Democrats	Stuart Medcalf	271	37.8	N/A
Labour	Edward Lloyd	103	14.4	N/A
Rejected ballots		2	0.3	
Majority		71	9.9	
Turnout		718	34.3	+34.2
Registered electors		2,094		
Conservative hold				

=== Upper Weald ===
Upper Weald
Party	Candidate	Votes	%	±%
Conservative	Clair Bell*	392	57.6	+57.5
Liberal Democrats	Keith Brannan	173	25.4	N/A
Labour	Mark Harris	116	17.0	N/A
Rejected ballots		6	0.9	
Majority		219	32.2	
Turnout		687	33.3	+33.2
Registered electors		2,066		
Conservative hold				

=== Victoria ===
Victoria
Party	Candidate	Votes	%	±%
Labour	Tania Gauder	588	48.7	+10.1
Labour	Charles Suddards*	535	44.3	+14.2
Conservative	Charles Ellis	294	24.3	+1.2
Green	Kati Ramsden	267	22.1	−0.1
Conservative	Tony Trilsbach	264	21.9	+2.1
Green	Steve Sitton	222	18.4	N/A
Liberal Democrats	Sally Newing	127	10.5	−11.4
Rejected ballots		14	1.1	
Majority		241	20.0	
Turnout		1,222	24.7	−4.1
Registered electors		4,944		
Labour hold		Swing		
Labour hold		Swing		

=== Washford ===
Washford
Party	Candidate	Votes	%	±%
Labour	Clive Hallett	162	31.3	+11.2
Independent	James Ransley	155	29.9	N/A
Conservative	Dirk Ross	148	28.6	−23.0
Green	Matt Palmer	53	10.2	−18.3
Rejected ballots		3	0.6	
Majority		7	1.4	
Turnout		521	25.3	+0.4
Registered electors		2,059		
Labour gain from Conservative				

=== Weald Central ===
Weald Central
Party	Candidate	Votes	%	±%
Conservative	Alan Pickering*	591	48.8	+0.2
Conservative	Jessamy Blanford*	569	46.9	−0.8
Green	Philip Monaghan	298	24.6	+4.6
Green	Alexander Bienfait	280	23.1	N/A
Labour	Sue Hallett	234	19.3	+13.5
Labour	Derek Smyth	187	15.4	+10.4
Reform	Wendy Repasky	90	7.4	N/A
Rejected ballots		2	0.2	
Majority		271	22.4	
Turnout		1,214	30.9	−7.56
Registered electors		3,931		
Conservative hold		Swing		
Conservative hold		Swing		

=== Weald North ===
Weald North
Party	Candidate	Votes	%	±%
Conservative	Kayleigh Brunger-Randall	467	50.2	+2.5
Ashford Ind.	Philly Adams	249	26.7	N/A
Green	Hilary Jones	127	13.6	−15.3
Labour	Jordan Richardson	88	9.5	N/A
Rejected ballots		4	0.4	
Majority		218	23.4	
Turnout		935	44.4	−3.3
Registered electors		2,108		
Conservative hold				

=== Weald South ===
Weald South
Party	Candidate	Votes	%	±%
Ashford Ind.	David Ledger*	617	41.5	−16.9
Conservative	Aline Hicks	571	38.5	−5.9
Ashford Ind.	George Sparks*	511	34.4	−16.4
Conservative	Nicola Denoon Duncan	500	33.7	−1.5
Liberal Democrats	Theresa Dickens	229	15.4	N/A
Labour	Norma Smyth	195	13.1	N/A
Labour	Steven Horne	194	13.1	N/A
Rejected ballots		13	0.9	
Majority		60	4.0	
Turnout		1,498	34.7	−4.2
Registered electors		4,323		
Ashford Ind. hold		Swing		
Conservative gain from Ashford Ind.		Swing		

=== Willesborough ===
Willesborough
Party	Candidate	Votes	%	±%
Green	Steven Campkin*	1,102	69.3	+24.7
Green	Liz Wright*	962	60.5	+21.2
Conservative	Patricia Speakman	328	20.6	−6.4
Conservative	Charles Dehnel	301	18.9	−6.1
Labour	Ifeyinwa Ajulufo	203	12.8	+1.9
Labour	Ikechi Okere	171	10.7	N/A
Rejected ballots		6	0.4	
Majority		634	39.8	
Turnout		1,597	33.5	
Registered electors		4,768		
Green hold		Swing		
Green hold		Swing		

=== Wye with Hinxhill ===
Wye with Hinxhill
Party	Candidate	Votes	%	±%
Ashford Ind.	Noel Ovenden*	541	76.1	−5.2
Conservative	John Lawton	72	10.1	−0.1
Labour	Tahsil Hashemi	62	8.7	N/A
Liberal Democrats	David Browne	36	5.1	−3.6
Rejected ballots		0	0.0	
Majority		469	66.0	
Turnout		711	38.0	−5.6
Registered electors		1,869		
Ashford Ind. hold				

== Changes 2023–2027 ==
- Bill Barrett, elected as a Conservative in Singleton East, joined the Ashford Independents in June 2023 before leaving the group to sit as an independent in early 2025.
- Labour councillors Kate Leavey and Alan Dean left the Labour group to sit as independents; Dean later joined the Green group in June 2025.

=== By-elections ===
==== Aylesford & East Stour ====
The by-election was triggered by the resignation of Labour councillor Sojan Joseph after his election as MP for Ashford.

Aylesford & East Stour by-election: 17 October 2024
Party	Candidate	Votes	%	±%
Green	Thom Pizzey	299	31.6	+2.8
Labour	Reena Mathew	293	31.0	−1.2
Reform	Brian Collins	216	22.9	N/A
Conservative	Jac Wood	111	11.7	−2.2
Liberal Democrats	Alexander Coxall	26	2.8	N/A
Rejected ballots		2	0.2	
Majority		6	0.6	{{{change}}}
Turnout		945	21.0	−2.2
Registered electors		4,587		
Green gain from Labour				

==== Rolvenden & Tenterden West ====
The by-election was triggered by the resignation of Green councillor Kate Walder.

Rolvenden & Tenterden West by-election: 25 September 2025
Party	Candidate	Votes	%	±%
Green	Guy Pullen	262	36.5	–16.9
Reform	Tony Trilsbach	227	31.6	N/A
Conservative	George Davis	200	27.9	–10.3
Liberal Democrats	Chris Grayling	19	2.6	N/A
Labour	Ava Charlton	10	1.4	–7.0
Majority		35	4.9	
Rejected ballots		2	0.3	
Turnout		720	36.2	
Registered electors		1,987		
Green hold		Swing		
