= 2019 Ashford Borough Council election =

2019 English local election

- 2 May 2019

All 47 seats to Ashford Borough Council 24 seats needed for a majority

	First party	Second party	Third party
Party	Conservative	Ashford Ind.	Labour
Last election	34 seats, 51.9%	3 seats, 5.6%	4 seats, 19.9%
Seats won	26	11	7
Seat change	▼8	▲8	▲3
Popular vote	13,429	6,544	5,476
Percentage	39.2%	19.1%	14.9%
Swing	▼12.7%	▲13.5%	▼3.9%
	Fourth party	Fifth party
Party	Green	Independent
Last election	0 seats, 6.5%	0 seats, 2.9%
Seats won	2	1
Seat change	▲2	▲1
Popular vote	4,500	556
Percentage	13.2%	1.6%
Swing	▲6.7%	▼1.3%
- Winner of each seat at the 2019 Ashford Borough Council election
Council control before election
Conservative
Council control after election
Conservative

The 2019 Ashford Borough Council election took place on 2 May 2019 to elect members of Ashford Borough Council in England. This was on the same day as other local elections.

== Summary ==
=== Election result ===
2019 Ashford Borough Council election
Party	Candidates	Seats	Gains	Losses	Net gain/loss	Seats %	Votes %	Votes	+/−
Conservative	47	26	0	8	▼8	55.3	39.2	13,429	–12.7
Ashford Ind.	15	11	4	0	▲8	23.4	19.1	6,544	+13.5
Labour	27	7	3	0	▲3	14.9	16.0	5,476	–3.9
Green	19	2	2	0	▲2	4.3	13.2	4,500	+6.7
Independent	1	1	1	0	▲1	2.1	1.6	556	–1.3
Liberal Democrats	15	0	0	1	▼1	0.0	6.4	2,203	+3.3
UKIP	8	0	0	1	▼1	0.0	4.4	1,510	–5.7

== Ward results ==
=== Aylesford & East Stour ===
Aylesford & East Stour
Party	Candidate	Votes	%
Ashford Ind.	David Smith	426	38.5
Ashford Ind.	Andy Rogers	365	33.0
Labour	Matthew Harris	253	22.9
Labour	Garry Harrison	237	21.4
Green	Joanna Baker	160	14.5
Conservative	John Seaton	150	13.6
UKIP	Dave Vegas	147	13.3
Conservative	Ijeoma Onweluzo	121	10.9
Green	Philip Monaghan	88	8.0
Liberal Democrats	Hein Behrens	70	6.3
Majority			
Turnout		1,115	24.6
Ashford Ind. win (new seat)			
Ashford Ind. win (new seat)			

=== Beaver ===
Beaver
Party	Candidate	Votes	%	±%
Labour	Lyn Suddards	480	43.4	
Labour	Alexander Ward	437	39.5	
UKIP	Thomas Taylor	283	25.6	
Conservative	Amanda Hodgkinson	238	21.5	
Green	Maria Pizzey	237	21.4	
Conservative	Rob Dobson	183	16.6	
Majority				
Turnout		1,107	24.1	
Labour hold		Swing		
Labour gain from UKIP		Swing		

=== Biddenden ===
Biddenden
Party	Candidate	Votes	%	±%
Conservative	Neil Bell	575	72.0	−1.0
Green	Guy Pullen	224	28.0	+1.0
Majority				
Turnout		805	34.5	
Conservative hold		Swing		

=== Bircholt ===
Bircholt
Party	Candidate	Votes	%
Conservative	William Howard	Unopposed	
Majority			
Turnout		–	–
Conservative win (new seat)			

=== Bockhanger ===
Bockhanger
Party	Candidate	Votes	%	±%
Labour	Diccon Spain	280	49.1	+15.6
Conservative	Simon Howard-Smith	222	38.9	−27.6
Liberal Democrats	Carol Wilcox	68	11.9	New
Majority				
Turnout		578	27.7	
Labour gain from Conservative		Swing		

=== Bybrook ===
Bybrook
Party	Candidate	Votes	%	±%
Ashford Ind.	Howard Turner	297	43.9	New
Conservative	Shafi Khan	203	30.0	−25.8
Labour	Alan Dean	176	26.0	−18.2
Majority				
Turnout		683	33.2	
Ashford Ind. gain from Conservative		Swing		

=== Charing ===
Charing
Party	Candidate	Votes	%	±%
Conservative	Gerry Clarkson	479	71.6	+20.5
Labour	Janet White	190	28.4	New
Majority				
Turnout		719	33.9	
Conservative hold		Swing		

=== Conningbrook & Little Burton Farm ===
Conningbrook & Little Burton Farm
Party	Candidate	Votes	%
Ashford Ind.	Katherine Ovenden	330	70.4
Conservative	Yvonne Roden	139	29.6
Majority			
Turnout		474	31.6
Ashford Ind. win (new seat)			

=== Downs North ===
Downs North
Party	Candidate	Votes	%	±%
Conservative	Stephen Dehnel	375	47.4	−14.2
Green	Marilyn Sansom	186	23.5	+4.3
Liberal Democrats	David Reid	148	18.7	New
Labour	Carly Ruppert-Lingham	82	10.4	−8.8
Majority				
Turnout		806	39.5	
Conservative hold		Swing		

=== Downs West ===
Downs West
Party	Candidate	Votes	%	±%
Conservative	Larry Krause	485	62.4	−5.0
Green	Geoffery Meaden	220	28.3	−4.3
Labour	Noyo Rai	72	9.3	New
Majority				
Turnout		798	34.7	
Conservative hold		Swing		

=== Furley ===
Furley
Party	Candidate	Votes	%
Conservative	Andrew Buchanan	459	34.3
Labour	Euan Anckorn	454	33.9
Conservative	Graham Galpin	453	33.8
Green	Peter Morgan	380	28.4
Liberal Democrats	Andrew Graham	244	18.2
UKIP	Susannah Burden	184	13.7
UKIP	Eddy Barrows	170	12.7
Majority			
Turnout		1,345	29.8
Conservative win (new seat)			
Labour win (new seat)			

=== Goat Lees ===
Goat Lees
Party	Candidate	Votes	%
Ashford Ind.	Winston Michael	586	82.8
Conservative	James Ransley	67	9.5
Labour	Jane Carling	55	7.8
Majority			
Turnout		711	38.0
Ashford Ind. win (new seat)			

=== Godinton ===
Godinton
Party	Candidate	Votes	%	±%
Conservative	Peter Feacey	331	55.5	+14.0
Green	Chris Squire	148	24.8	+15.1
Labour	Kaprasad Chhantyal	117	19.6	+3.1
Majority				
Turnout		609	31.4	
Conservative hold		Swing		

=== Highfield ===
Highfield
Party	Candidate	Votes	%	±%
Conservative	Gerald White	290	41.1	−3.2
Ashford Ind.	Barry Ball	201	28.5	−0.7
Green	Emma Nash	132	18.7	+8.6
Liberal Democrats	Clare Hardwick	82	11.6	New
Majority				
Turnout		714	35.1	
Conservative hold		Swing		

=== Isle of Oxney ===
Isle of Oxney
Party	Candidate	Votes	%	±%
Conservative	Mick Burgess	Unopposed		
Majority				
Turnout		–	–	–
Conservative hold		Swing		

=== Kennington ===
Kennington
Party	Candidate	Votes	%	±%
Conservative	Nathan Iliffe	553	62.0	
Ashford Ind.	Ian Anderson	266	29.8	
Liberal Democrats	Stuart Dove	73	8.2	
Majority				
Turnout		895	50.5	
Conservative hold		Swing		

=== Kingsnorth Village & Bridgefield ===
Kingsnorth Village & Bridgefield
Party	Candidate	Votes	%
Ashford Ind.	Tina Heyes	360	69.1
Conservative	David Robey	161	30.9
Majority			
Turnout		528	29.2
Ashford Ind. win (new seat)			

=== Mersham, Sevington South with Finberry ===
Mersham, Sevington South with Finberry
Party	Candidate	Votes	%
Conservative	Paul Bartlett	Unopposed	
Majority			
Turnout		–	–
Conservative win (new seat)			

=== Norman ===
Norman
Party	Candidate	Votes	%	±%
Conservative	Jenny Webb	205	34.2	
Labour	Dylan Jones	187	31.2	
UKIP	Neil Burgess	130	21.7	
Green	Al Arnold	78	13.0	
Majority				
Turnout		602	30.0	
Conservative hold		Swing		

=== Park Farm North ===
Park Farm North
Party	Candidate	Votes	%	±%
Conservative	Jo Gideon	300	61.5	
Labour	Kate Leavey	97	19.9	
Liberal Democrats	Theresa Dickens	91	18.6	
Majority				
Turnout		501	27.2	
Conservative hold		Swing		

=== Park Farm South ===
Park Farm South
Party	Candidate	Votes	%	±%
Conservative	James Wedgbury	291	61.1	
Labour	Amy Mitchell	103	21.6	
Liberal Democrats	Christopher Grayling	82	17.2	
Majority				
Turnout		490	26.2	
Conservative hold		Swing		

=== Repton ===
Repton
Party	Candidate	Votes	%
Conservative	Matthew Forest	411	55.8
Conservative	Bernard Heyes	345	46.8
Labour	Patric Nutton	223	30.3
Green	Dave Higgins	220	29.9
Liberal Democrats	Alexander Coxall	133	18.0
Majority			
Turnout		755	25.4
Conservative win (new seat)			
Conservative win (new seat)			

=== Rolvenden & Tenterden West ===
Rolvenden & Tenterden West
Party	Candidate	Votes	%	±%
Independent	Kate Walder	556	61.2	
Conservative	Mike Bennett	352	38.8	
Majority				
Turnout		920	46.8	
Independent gain from Conservative		Swing		

=== Roman ===
Roman
Party	Candidate	Votes	%
Ashford Ind.	Heather Hayward	366	59.1
Conservative	Callum Furner	193	31.2
Labour	Waheed Qureshi	60	9.7
Majority			
Turnout		627	29.2
Ashford Ind. win (new seat)			

=== Saxon Shore ===
Saxon Shore
Party	Candidate	Votes	%	±%
Ashford Ind.	Linda Harman	528	56.3	
Conservative	Jane Martin	410	43.7	
Majority				
Turnout		943	46.2	
Ashford Ind. gain from Conservative		Swing		

=== Singleton East ===
Singleton East
Party	Candidate	Votes	%
Conservative	Bill Barrett	202	42.3
Labour	Dhan Limbu	134	28.1
Green	Claire Wallington	92	19.3
Liberal Democrats	Nicholas Mengham	49	10.3
Majority			
Turnout		493	26.9
Conservative win (new seat)			

=== Singleton West ===
Singleton West
Party	Candidate	Votes	%
Conservative	Kalysha Howard-Smith	189	42.2
Labour	Sally Gathern	168	37.5
Liberal Democrats	Ken Standish	91	20.3
Majority			
Turnout		470	23.8
Conservative win (new seat)			

=== Stanhope ===
Stanhope
Party	Candidate	Votes	%	±%
Labour	Brandan Chilton	257	67.1	
Conservative	Brad Bradford	70	18.3	
Green	Thom Pizzey	56	14.6	
Majority				
Turnout		394	20.3	
Labour hold		Swing		

=== Tenterden North ===
Tenterden North
Party	Candidate	Votes	%	±%
Conservative	Paul Clokie	535	72.5	
Labour	David Ward	203	27.5	
Majority				
Turnout		777	40.2	
Conservative hold		Swing		

=== Tenterden South ===
Tenterden South
Party	Candidate	Votes	%	±%
Conservative	Callum Knowles	Unopposed		
Majority				
Turnout		–	–	–
Conservative hold		Swing		

=== Tenterden St. Michael's ===
Tenterden St. Michael's
Party	Candidate	Votes	%
Conservative	John Link	Unopposed	
Majority			
Turnout		–	–
Conservative win (new seat)			

=== Upper Weald ===
Upper Weald
Party	Candidate	Votes	%
Conservative	Clair Bell	Unopposed	
Majority			
Turnout		–	–
Conservative win (new seat)			

=== Victoria ===
Victoria
Party	Candidate	Votes	%	±%
Labour	Dara Farrell	484	38.6	
Labour	Charles Suddards	378	30.1	
Conservative	Jeremy Adby	290	23.1	
Green	Jonathan Small	278	22.2	
Liberal Democrats	Charlotte Mbali	274	21.9	
Conservative	Matthew Bridger	248	19.8	
UKIP	Peter Stewart	186	14.8	
UKIP	Ann Taylor	193	15.4	
Majority				
Turnout		1,259	28.8	
Labour hold		Swing		
Labour gain from Conservative		Swing		

=== Washford ===
Washford
Party	Candidate	Votes	%	±%
Conservative	Neil Shorter	257	51.5	
Green	Joe Annandale	142	28.5	
Labour	Malcolm Wiffen	100	20.0	
Majority				
Turnout		512	24.9	
Conservative hold		Swing		

=== Weald Central ===
Weald Central
Party	Candidate	Votes	%	±%
Conservative	Alan Pickering	606	48.6	
Conservative	Jessamy Blanford	595	47.7	
Ashford Ind.	Sarah Dacre	384	30.8	
Ashford Ind.	Matthew Peach	371	29.7	
Green	Hannah Laws	250	20.0	
Labour	Katie Homewood	72	5.8	
Labour	Vivien Wheatley	62	5.0	
Majority				
Turnout		1,266	38.4	
Conservative hold		Swing		
Conservative hold		Swing		

=== Weald North ===
Weald North
Party	Candidate	Votes	%	±%
Conservative	Ken Mulholland	439	47.6	
Green	Hilary Jones	266	28.9	
UKIP	Gary Hanson	217	23.5	
Majority				
Turnout		931	47.6	
Conservative hold		Swing		

=== Weald South ===
Weald South
Party	Candidate	Votes	%	±%
Ashford Ind.	David Ledger	941	58.4	
Ashford Ind.	George Sparks	818	50.8	
Conservative	Aline Hicks	715	44.4	
Conservative	Charles Dehnel	567	35.2	
Majority				
Turnout		1,638	38.9	
Ashford Ind. gain from Conservative		Swing		
Ashford Ind. gain from Conservative		Swing		

=== Willesborough ===
Willesborough
Party	Candidate	Votes	%
Green	Steven Campkin	714	44.6
Green	Liz Wright	629	39.3
Conservative	Belinda Naiken-Payne	433	27.0
Liberal Democrats	Matthew Baker	426	26.6
Conservative	Carole White	401	25.0
Liberal Democrats	Adrian Gee-Turner	301	18.8
Labour	Elizampeth Mylonogianni	175	10.9
Majority			
Turnout		1,638	35.8
Green gain from Liberal Democrats			
Green gain from Conservative			

=== Wye with Hinxhill ===
Wye with Hinxhill
Party	Candidate	Votes	%
Ashford Ind.	Noel Ovenden	671	81.2
Conservative	Aidan Wedgbury	84	10.2
Liberal Democrats	David Browne	71	8.6
Majority			
Turnout		831	43.6
Ashford Ind. win (new seat)			

== By-elections ==
=== Downs North (July 2019) ===
Downs North: 18 July 2019
Party	Candidate	Votes	%	±%
Conservative	Charles Dehnel	229	35.6	–11.8
Green	Geoff Meaden	190	29.5	+6.0
Liberal Democrats	Adrian Gee-Turner	70	10.9	–7.8
Ashford Ind.	Rachael Carley	67	10.4	N/A
Independent	Sarah Williams	49	7.6	N/A
UKIP	Philip Meads	22	3.4	N/A
Labour	Carly Ruppert Lingham	17	2.6	–7.7
Majority		39	6.1	
Turnout		645	31.5	
Registered electors		2,046		
Conservative hold		Swing	▼8.9	

The Downs North by-election was triggered by the death of councillor Stephen Dehnel.

=== Park Farm North ===
Park Farm North: 12 March 2020
Party	Candidate	Votes	%	±%
Ashford Ind.	Trish Cornish	247	60.2	N/A
Conservative	Aline Hicks	115	28.0	–33.5
Labour	Garry Harrison	29	7.1	–12.8
Green	Thom Pizzey	11	2.7	N/A
Liberal Democrats	Samuel Strolz	8	2.0	–16.6
Majority		132	32.2	
Turnout		410	22.1	
Registered electors		1,859		
Ashford Ind. gain from Conservative		Swing	N/A	

The Park Farm North by-election followed the resignation of councillor Jo Gideon, who had been elected as Member of Parliament for Stoke-on-Trent Central at the 2019 United Kingdom general election.

=== Beaver ===
Beaver: 6 May 2021
Party	Candidate	Votes	%	±%
Conservative	Trevor Brooks	468	42.2	+23.0
Labour	Dylan Jones	402	36.2	−2.6
Independent	Garry Harrison	105	9.5	N/A
Green	Thom Pizzey	70	6.3	−12.8
Liberal Democrats	Jacqueline Stamp	64	5.8	N/A
Majority		66	6.0	
Turnout		1,115	23.5	
Registered electors		4,752		
Conservative gain from Labour		Swing	▲12.8	

=== Downs North (August 2021) ===
Downs North: 19 August 2021
Party	Candidate	Votes	%	±%
Green	Geoff Meaden	273	51.8	+28.3
Conservative	Sarah Williams	239	45.4	−2.1
Liberal Democrats	Carol Wilcox	15	2.8	−15.9
Majority		34	6.6	
Turnout		529	26.0	
Registered electors		2,038		
Green gain from Conservative		Swing	▲15.2	

=== Highfield ===
Highfield: 16 December 2021
Party	Candidate	Votes	%	±%
Green	Dawnie Nilsson	191	40.0	+21.2
Conservative	James Ransley	163	34.1	−7.0
Ashford Ind.	Barry Ball	101	21.1	−7.4
Labour	Terry Pavlou	23	4.8	N/A
Majority		28	5.9	
Turnout		478	23.6	
Registered electors		2,020		
Green gain from Conservative		Swing	▲14.1	
