= Smartlink, Ashford =

Smartlink was a passenger bus transit system link proposed in 2006 between the town centre of Ashford, Kent, England and its suburbs and main amenities.

== Aims of the scheme ==
Smartlink was an element of the transport strategy for Ashford (along with junction 10 improvements and junction 10A development on the M20 motorway, a new Victoria Way and the dualing of Chart Road. It is intended to increase in the number and proportion of trips by sustainable means, particularly passenger transport. The aim is integrated bus provision across the town.

The plan was to give the Smartlink buses priority over other traffic and passengers improved waiting environments with real time travel information.

== Routes ==
A three-legged Smartlink system was proposed, linking the town centre with

1. Chilmington Green to the south-west, possibly serving Cobbs Wood, Godinton Park, Singleton and Stanhope.
2. Finberry to the south-east, also linking with the Orbital Business Park, Waterbrook, the Newtown Railway Works, Designer Outlet and the International railway station.
3. The Warren to the north-west, serving the Eureka leisure development at junction 9 of the M20.

Parking was to be play a key part in the overall strategy for encouraging use of alternative modes of travel, and demand will be met by building new car parks and developing park & ride at the edges of the town. Three park & ride sites were proposed to anchor the new system, with a phased implementation programme over ten years.

The three-route proposal was perhaps prematurely announced, aligned with particular developer landowners' interests in mind, over the interests of others.

== Constraints ==
One of the constraints to implementing Smartlink was the lack of height and width underneath the existing Newtown Road bridge, which lies upon the Cheeseman's Green route. The existing bridge headroom only allows use by mini-buses, restricts two-way traffic and only incorporates a narrow elevated footway on one side of the carriageway. Several scheme options were assessed and the preferred option was to replace the existing bridge with a new bridge to current design standards. This would have improved accessibility by bus, cycle and pedestrians between the town centre and the surrounding south-eastern area of the town.

Proposed works included -

- Improving the existing headroom under the bridge from 3.0 metres to 3.7 m in order to allow use of Newtown Road by single decker buses, including future Smartlink buses.
- To increase the width of the carriageway from 5.1 m to 6.3 m to allow the free and safe flow of two-way traffic including buses.
- To replace the existing narrow 1.5 m elevated footway with a 4.25 m wide segregated footway/cycleway to facilitate the safe passage of cyclists and pedestrians.

In the longer term, the objective is for Newtown Road to be improved in further phases to provide a strategic highway network extending south-east of the town to provide improved multi-modal access to the housing areas of Cheeseman's Green and the employment areas of Waterbrook and the Orbital Business Park.

== Funding ==
It was planned that the estimated £30 million cost of the development would be funded:

- within the new housing areas of Cheeseman's Green and Chilmington Green, by the developers and ultimately the new homebuyers
- the remainder being allocated by the Office of the Deputy Prime Minister (ODPM)

== Completion ==
The proposal was to deliver Smartlink in two phases, phase one by 2012, with phase two by 2016, dependent upon the development of Cheeseman's Green and Chilmington Green. In practice, it is expected that the Park & Ride scheme will be in place by 2009 (originally 2008), using conventional buses, but then "streetcar" type vehicles will be brought into use as the development continues.
