= Transport in Ashford, Kent =

Ashford is a town in Kent, England, which lies on several major transport routes.

== Local ==
In the 1970s the A292 Ashford Ring Road was created around the town centre and is well known for being popular with boy racers. The Ring Road was conceived to relieve traffic congestion along the previous main thoroughfare through the town centre, the narrow East Hill. There is work under way to convert the Ring Road to two-way operation to minimise the "race track" feel and help bring the isolated town centre back into the rest of the area.

There are plans for a fast link between the town centre and the suburbs and main amenities, creating an alternative to the car called "SMARTLINK".

== National and international ==
=== Roads ===
Ashford was one of the towns that became a hub when the roads were turnpiked in the second half of the 18th century. Today it is on the M20 motorway which offers easy access to London, Maidstone and Folkestone, with junctions 9 and 10 serving Ashford. The A20 runs almost parallel with the motorway, and the A28 allows access to Canterbury and Tenterden. Also leaving Ashford are the A251 for Faversham and the A2070 for Romney Marsh and Hastings.

Operation Stack on the M20 is the bane of Ashford. Usually implemented in response to industrial action in Calais, it brings Ashford to a halt several times each year. The Operation Stack of 29 November 2006 is estimated to have cost the town £2 million. Local and central government have spent 12 years studying the problem without making any progress towards a solution.

=== Railways ===
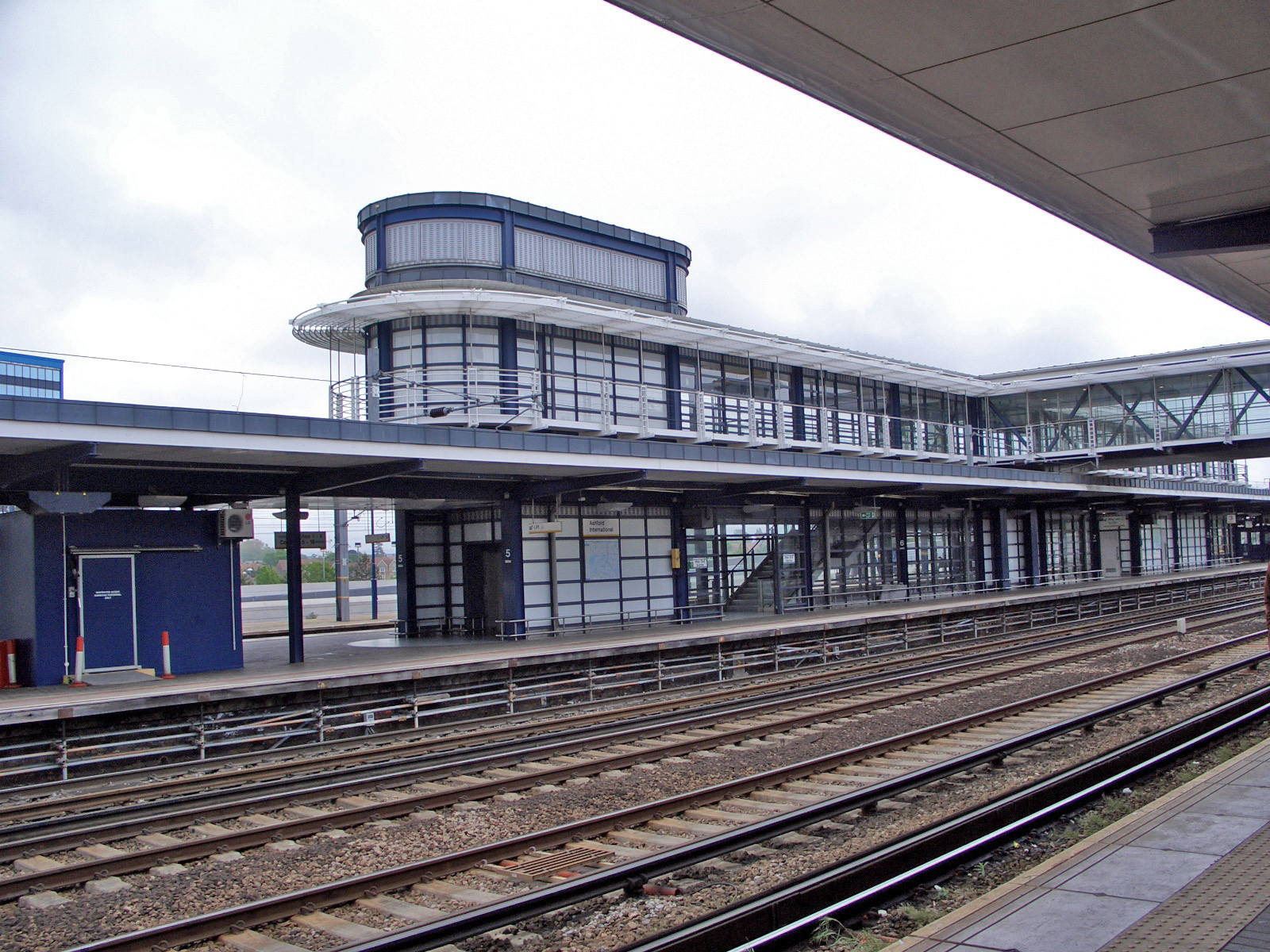
Ashford International

The South Eastern Railway (SER) opened its main line from London to the town on 1 December 1842, and by 7 February 1844 trains were running through to Dover. The importance to the town of the railway, however, was when the company established its locomotive works here. The railway community had its own shops, schools, pubs and bathhouse, and much of the area retains the look of a railway town (like Swindon or Crewe), however the works closed in 1981. Ashford became a junction with a line to Margate that was opened in 1846 and in 1851 the Marshlink Line to Hastings was opened. On 1 July 1884 SER's rival in Kent London, Chatham & Dover Railway (LCDR) opened its second main line via Maidstone to its own terminus in Ashford. On 1 January 1899 SER and LCDR merged to form the South Eastern & Chatham Railway (SECR) and soon after the LCDR Maidstone terminus was closed and a connection established from the SER station to the LCDR line. The LCDR's works at Battersea were closed in 1911 with work shifting to Ashford.

When the Channel Tunnel was opened on 6 May 1994, the new Ashford International station began operating. It now serves the high-speed rail link that began service in 2003 carrying the Eurostar from England to the continent, with stops in London, Ashford and then on to Brussels, Lille, Paris and connections to the rest of Europe. Ashford has direct trains services to Brussels, frequent services to Lille and Paris via Ebbsfleet International and St Pancras. Local firms, residents and politicians are amongst those seeking a less drastic change in the Eurostar timetable.

With the introduction of domestic train services along High Speed 1 between St Pancras, Stratford International in east London and Ashford, it is expected to pull the outer limits of the London commuter belt to the town and beyond, as travel time from Ashford to London is reduced from 83 to about 37 minutes. Currently there are off peak services to London that only take 63 minutes and 60 minutes from London to Ashford.

=== Air ===
Ashford was formerly served by Lympne Airport, with scheduled services to Le Touquet and Vichy in France. Commercial services from Lympne ceased in 1974.

Lydd Airport is approximately 17 miles (27 km) from Ashford, with regular flights to Le Touquet, France by Lydd Air. There is a small airfield located at Headcorn (17 miles (27 km) by road, but only 13 minutes on the main Ashford to London railway) west of Ashford) at which there is an aviation museum and a parachuting centre. Gatwick Airport, the nearest fully international airport is 58 miles (93 km) from Ashford.
