= Jo Gideon =

British Conservative politician (born 1952)

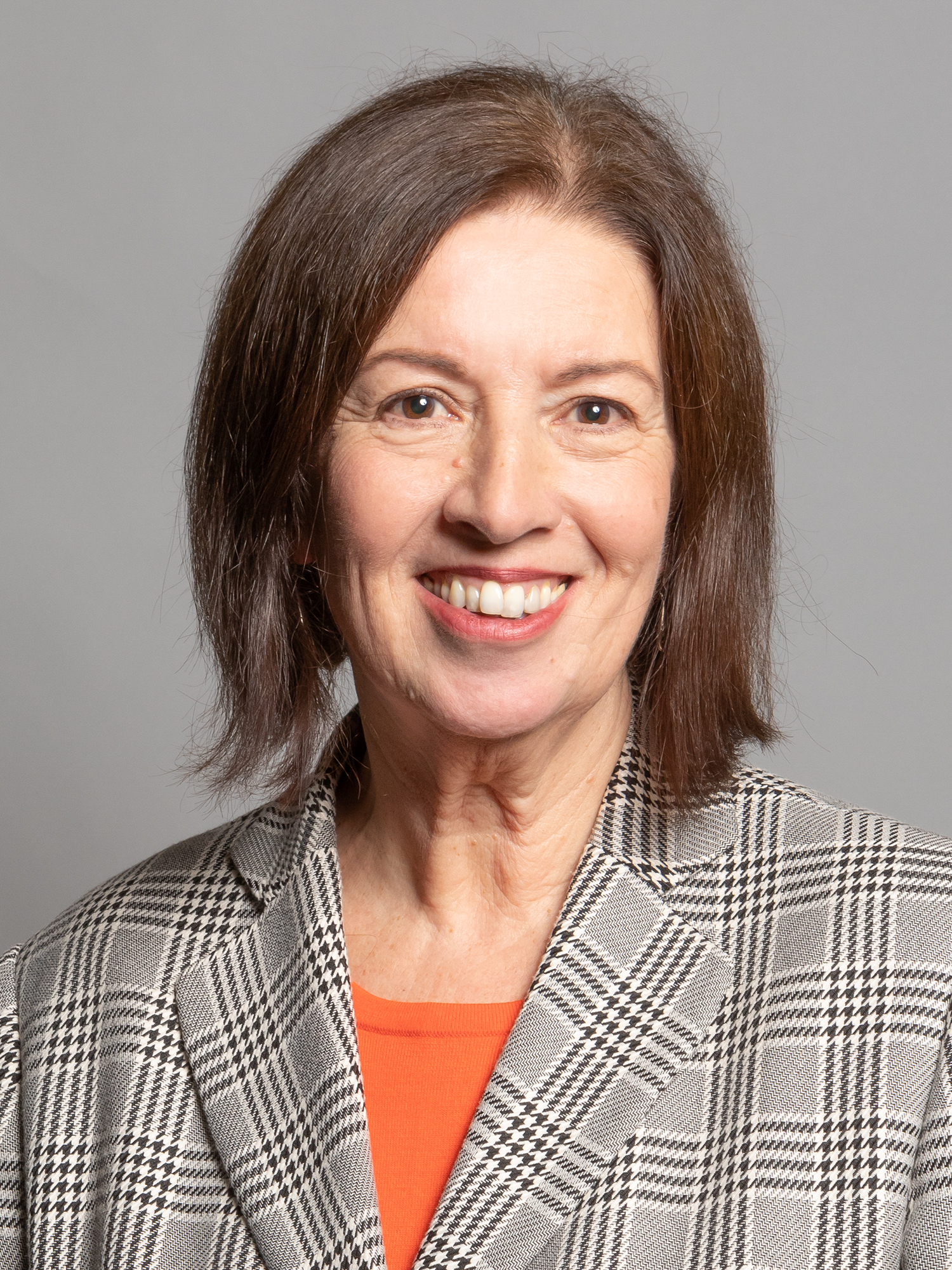

Member of Parliament for Stoke-on-Trent Central
- In office 12 December 2019 – 30 May 2024
- Preceded by: Gareth Snell
- Succeeded by: Gareth Snell

Personal details
- Born: Joanna Mary Gideon; 7 November 1952 (age 73) Birmingham, England
- Party: Conservative
- Children: 3, including Ingrid Oliver
- Education: University of Birmingham

Joanna Mary Gideon (born 7 November 1952) is a British Conservative Party politician, who served as the Member of Parliament (MP) for Stoke-on-Trent Central constituency from the 2019 general election to the 2024 general election.

== Early life and career ==
Gideon studied at Stourbridge High School, and then earned a degree (BA Hons in German) from the University of Birmingham. She has worked in higher education as a small business owner: she ran a business importing and selling handmade paper.

== Political career ==
Gideon, whilst known as Jo Booth, was elected in 2003 as a Conservative councillor on Thanet District Council, representing Cliffsend and Pegwell ward until 2015. Later that year, she sought the nomination to be Conservative candidate for the 2016 Kent Police and Crime Commissioner election.

She contested the marginal seat of Scunthorpe at the 2015 general election, but lost to the Labour incumbent, Nic Dakin. At the 2017 general election, she stood in another marginal seat, Great Grimsby, and finished 2,565 votes behind Labour's sitting MP, Melanie Onn. Gideon was elected to Ashford Borough Council in May 2019 as a borough councillor, where she was a cabinet member for Community Safety & Wellbeing. She stood down as councillor following her election to Parliament in December 2019, when she narrowly gained Stoke-on-Trent Central from Labour for the Conservatives, it being the third marginal seat she had stood for election in.

She has also worked as an aide to Damian Green, former Cabinet minister and MP for Ashford since 1997.

On 9 February 2023, she announced she would be standing down at the 2024 general election. She was the second so-called red wall MP to do so, after Dehenna Davison in Bishop Auckland.

== Personal life ==
Gideon was previously married and has two sons and a daughter, the actress Ingrid Oliver. She lists her recreations as "theatre, travel, family".

Parliament of the United Kingdom
Preceded by Gareth Snell	Member of Parliament for Stoke-on-Trent Central; 2019–2024	Succeeded by Gareth Snell
