= Listed buildings in Sevington =

Civil Parish in Kent, England

Sevington with Finberry is a village and civil parish in the Borough of Ashford of Kent, England. It contains one grade I and eight grade II listed buildings that are recorded in the National Heritage List for England.

This list is based on the information retrieved online from Historic England.

== Key ==
Grade	Criteria
I	Buildings that are of exceptional interest
II*	Particularly important buildings of more than special interest
II	Buildings that are of special interest

== Listing ==
Name	Grade	Location	Type	Completed (Note: The date given is the date used by Historic England as significant for the initial building or that of an important part in the structure's description.)	Date designated	Grid ref. (Note: The grid reference is based on the British national grid reference system, sometimes known as OSGB36, used by the Ordnance Survey.) Geo-coordinates	Notes	Entry number (Note: The "List Entry Number" is a unique number assigned to each listed building and scheduled monument by Historic England.)	Image	Wikidata
Maytree Cottages	II	1 and 2			16 February 1989	TR0364340408; 51°07′36″N 0°54′32″E		1233936	Upload Photo	Q26527370
Ashdown Ashdown Cottage	II	Sevington			16 February 1989	TR0357640573; 51°07′42″N 0°54′29″E		1233932	Upload Photo	Q26527366
Barn About 20 Metres South East of Court Lodge	II	Sevington			16 February 1989	TR0361440818; 51°07′50″N 0°54′31″E		1276464	Upload Photo	Q26565974
Bridge Cottage	II	Sevington			16 February 1989	TR0375040364; 51°07′35″N 0°54′37″E		1233764	Upload Photo	Q26527210
Church of St Mary	I	Sevington			27 November 1957	TR0370540875; 51°07′51″N 0°54′36″E		1233902	Church of St Mary More images	Q17529405
Court Lodge	II	Sevington			13 October 1952	TR0360640845; 51°07′50″N 0°54′31″E		1276463	Upload Photo	Q26565973
Imber	II	Sevington			16 February 1989	TR0375940186; 51°07′29″N 0°54′38″E		1233971	Upload Photo	Q26527403
Orchard Cottage	II	Sevington			16 February 1989	TR0353640475; 51°07′39″N 0°54′27″E		1233763	Upload Photo	Q26527209
Swanton Court	II	Sevington			27 November 1957	TR0388239346; 51°07′02″N 0°54′42″E		1233765	Upload Photo	Q26527211

== See also ==
- Grade I listed buildings in Kent
- Grade II* listed buildings in Kent

== Sources ==
- Newman, John (2012) [1969], Kent: West and the Weald, The Buildings of England, New Haven and London: Yale University Press, ISBN 978-0-300-18509-6
