= Listed buildings in Molash =

Historic structures in Kent, England

Molash is a village and civil parish in the Borough of Ashford of Kent, England. It contains one grade I, one grade II* and 19 grade II listed buildings that are recorded in the National Heritage List for England.

This list is based on the information retrieved online from Historic England.

== Key ==
Grade	Criteria
I	Buildings that are of exceptional interest
II*	Particularly important buildings of more than special interest
II	Buildings that are of special interest

== Listing ==
Name	Grade	Location	Type	Completed (Note: The date given is the date used by Historic England as significant for the initial building or that of an important part in the structure's description.)	Date designated	Grid ref. (Note: The grid reference is based on the British national grid reference system, sometimes known as OSGB36, used by the Ordnance Survey.) Geo-coordinates	Notes	Entry number (Note: The "List Entry Number" is a unique number assigned to each listed building and scheduled monument by Historic England.)	Image	Wikidata
Forge House	II	CT4 8HH			13 August 1984	TR0263251720; 51°13′43″N 0°54′03″E		1299477	Upload Photo	Q26586877
Coppins Farmhouse	II	Canterbury Road			13 August 1984	TR0297152002; 51°13′52″N 0°54′21″E		1071236	Upload Photo	Q26326266
Cherry Barton	II	Church Lane			13 August 1984	TR0252852026; 51°13′53″N 0°53′58″E		1071238	Upload Photo	Q26326271
Church Farmhouse	II	Church Lane			13 October 1952	TR0241852126; 51°13′57″N 0°53′53″E		1071237	Upload Photo	Q26326269
Church of St Peter	I	Church Lane			27 November 1957	TR0238352176; 51°13′58″N 0°53′51″E		1185844	Church of St Peter More images	Q17529355
Well House	II	Church Lane			13 August 1984	TR0261352063; 51°13′54″N 0°54′03″E		1185850	Upload Photo	Q26481142
Barn 30 Yards North West of Pontus Farmhouse	II	Knockwood Lane			13 August 1984	TR0206452515; 51°14′10″N 0°53′35″E		1071240	Upload Photo	Q26326276
Homefield Cottage	II	Knockwood Lane			13 August 1984	TR0171652253; 51°14′02″N 0°53′17″E		1071239	Upload Photo	Q26326273
Knockwood	II	Knockwood Lane			13 August 1984	TR0185451876; 51°13′49″N 0°53′23″E		1185863	Upload Photo	Q26481155
Pontus Farmhouse	II	Knockwood Lane			27 November 1957	TR0206052478; 51°14′09″N 0°53′35″E		1299469	Upload Photo	Q26586869
Barn 25 Yards East of Wytherling Court	II	Shottenden Road			13 August 1984	TR0366053161; 51°14′29″N 0°54′59″E		1185879	Upload Photo	Q26481172
Great Bower Farmhouse	II*	Shottenden Road			27 November 1957	TR0340852939; 51°14′22″N 0°54′45″E		1071242	Great Bower Farmhouse More images	Q17556169
Little Bower East Little Bower West	II	Shottenden Road			13 August 1984	TR0324653197; 51°14′30″N 0°54′38″E		1185885	Upload Photo	Q26481177
Nut Tree Cottage	II	Shottenden Road			13 August 1984	TR0337053851; 51°14′51″N 0°54′45″E		1071243	Upload Photo	Q26326283
Wytherling Court and Well House	II	Shottenden Road			13 August 1984	TR0363753188; 51°14′29″N 0°54′58″E		1071241	Upload Photo	Q26326279
Clarks Cottage	II	The Street			13 August 1984	TR0274151763; 51°13′45″N 0°54′09″E		1071245	Upload Photo	Q26326287
George Inn	II	The Street			13 August 1984	TR0281951837; 51°13′47″N 0°54′13″E		1299479	George Inn More images	Q26586879
Martin Lodge	II	The Street			13 August 1984	TR0280651879; 51°13′48″N 0°54′12″E		1071244	Upload Photo	Q26326285
Bagshot Cottage	II	Wellhouse Lane			13 August 1984	TR0185453585; 51°14′45″N 0°53′27″E		1362750	Upload Photo	Q26644620
Drylands Farmhouse	II	Wellhouse Lane			27 November 1957	TR0170953167; 51°14′31″N 0°53′18″E		1071246	Upload Photo	Q26326289
Harts Farmhouse	II	Wellhouse Lane			13 August 1984	TR0305753568; 51°14′42″N 0°54′29″E		1318886	Upload Photo	Q26604999

== See also ==
- Grade I listed buildings in Kent
- Grade II* listed buildings in Kent

== Sources ==
- Newman, John (2012) [1969], Kent: West and the Weald, The Buildings of England, New Haven and London: Yale University Press, ISBN 978-0-300-18509-6
