= Hothfield Common =

Nature reserve in Kent, England

Coordinates: 51.178°N 0.814°E

- Site of Special Scientific Interest
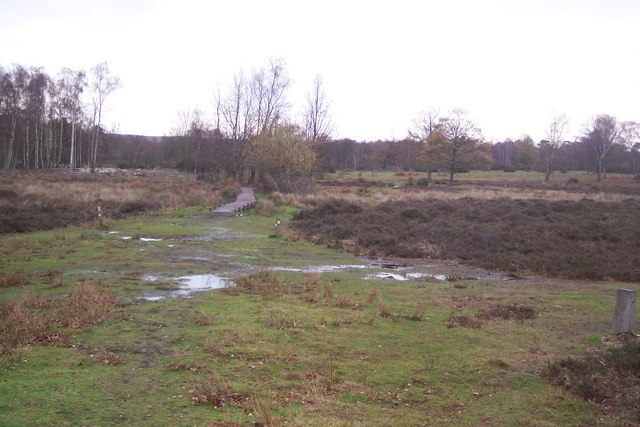
- Location of Hothfield Common.
- Area of search: Kent
- Grid reference: TQ 968 458
- Interest: Biological
- Area: 56.5 hectares (140 acres)
- Notification date: 1985
- Location map: Magic Map

Hothfield Common is a 56.5-hectare (140-acre) biological Site of Special Scientific Interest north-east of Ashford in Kent. It is also a Local Nature Reserve, and is part of the 86-hectare (210-acre) Hothfield Heathlands nature reserve owned by Ashford Borough Council and managed by Kent Wildlife Trust.

== Environment ==
Fifty-eight hectares of heathland and lowland valley bogs with secondary woodland around the perimeter, Hothfield contains Kent's last four valley bogs and one of its few remaining fragments of open heath with patches of acid grassland.

Until the early 20th century, livestock grazing maintained the open character of Hothfield Common. Once this ceased, bracken and birch began to overrun the reserve, leading to the loss of the heathland and bog habitat, and resulting in the loss of many rare and highly specialised plants and animals.

Habitat management work initiated by Kent Wildlife Trust with the support of Ashford Borough Council, Hothfield Parish Council and Natural England is now helping to restore and maintain a mosaic of open heath, grassland and bog. Once the initial invading scrub has been cut back, grazing with livestock is the key to maintaining suitable habitat. Grazing may occur at any time of the year so dogs should be kept under close control.

Many plants such as heather, cross-leaved heath, dwarf and common gorse, heath spotted-orchid, bog asphodel, and round-leaved sundew are now thriving, along with keeled skimmer dragonfly and tree pipit as a result of heath and bog habitat restoration.

== History ==
The common once covered a large area, possibly stretching from Ashford to Charing. It was one of the extensive heaths of Kent which formed on the free-draining Greensand exposures of the county. For some reason, Hothfield was spared the enclosures of the 19th century, unlike nearby Westwell Leacon, Charing and Lenham heaths. This may have been due to the landowners, the Tufton family, retaining the area for hunting. Encroachment upon Hothfield Heath began in the 18th century with the establishment of a school at Shipwash Farm and continued in 1835 with the construction of a workhouse by the West Ashford Union. From then on various households started encroaching upon the edges of the common.

During World War II the common was used as a training camp for troops. Some 300 Nissen huts were left there at the end of the war, and these were re-used by Ashford Rural District Council as emergency accommodation for homeless families. By 1955 these had all been moved away and the common was returned to the ownership of the Tufton family. However, in the absence of any commoners there was no real use for the land, and it was occupied by travellers and became a dumping ground for used cars. Following pressure by naturalists such as Dr Scott of Westwell, the District Council eventually purchased the land from the estate for £1,400 and designated 150 acres (60 ha) of the common a nature reserve. Organisations such as Kent Wildlife Trust, the Nature Conservancy and educational groups were included in the management committee.

== Ecology ==
Hothfield Heath has long been of interest to naturalists. As long ago as the 1820s, botanists such as G.E. Smith were documenting the unusual plants that occur there, particularly those of acid habitats such as Mat-grass and Bog Asphodel. The philosopher and economist John Stuart Mill was among the people collecting plants there in the 19th century. More systematic studies were undertaken by F.M. Webb and the local naturalists, W.R. Jeffrey and his son J.F. Jeffrey. Their findings are summarised in the Flora of Kent.

Henry Russell was vicar at Hothfield at the end of the 19th century, when he compiled a manuscript History of the Village which is now housed at Maidstone Library. It includes lists of wildlife, including 110 species of plants, although not all of these were on the common. Another early survey of the heath was undertaken by Francis Rose in the 1940s, when he published a description of the bryoflora (mosses and liverworts) in the journal of the British Bryological Society between 1949 and 1951. More recently, the Kent Field Club published lists of plants and animals at Hothfield in 1975.

This information amounts to a comprehensive inventory of the wildlife of the reserve, mostly in the form of lists available from the NBN Atlas. The flora and vegetation are described in detail in the Flora of Hothfield.

The main features of conservation value at Hothfield Common are the bogs, the acid grassland and the woods. There are five bogs, of which one, which is isolated from the main part of the reserve by the A20, has degraded into wet woodland. The acid grassland occurs in patches throughout, mainly along the paths. Woodland and scrub covers the remainder of the Common and, although there are some ancient woodland species present, it is more recent in origin and less important for wildlife.

Key species in the bogs include the bog-mosses Sphagnum papillosum and S. capillifolium, bog asphodel, round-leaved sundew and marsh St John's-wort. In the grassland there is bird's-foot clover (Trifolium ornithopodioides), clustered clover and subterranean clover. One of the rarest plants on the reserve is three-lobed crowfoot, which occurs in pools in some of the bogs. It is also considered an important site for invertebrates, with rare species such as the small shiny furrow bee (Lasioglossum semilucens) and the cranefly Tipula holoptera.

== Access ==
The site is open to the public at all times.
