= Molash =

Coordinates: 51.2266°N 0.9012°E

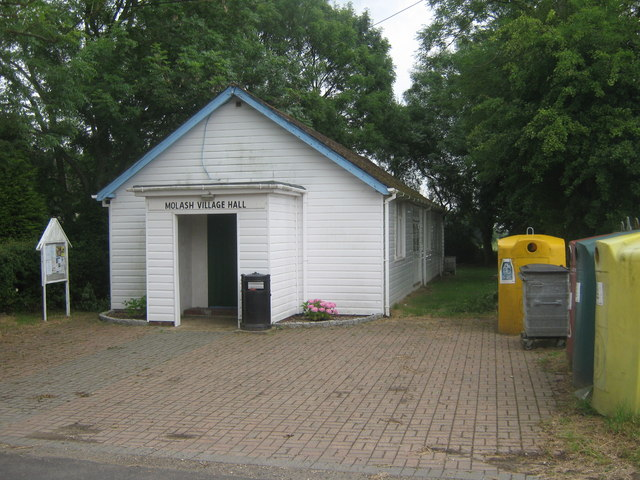
- Village hall

- Location within Kent
- Area: 6.38 km^{2} (2.46 sq mi)
- Population: 246 (Civil Parish 2011)
  - Density: 39/km^{2} (100/sq mi)
- OS grid reference: TR025515
- Civil parish: Molash
- District: Ashford
- Shire county: Kent
- Region: South East
- Country: England
- Sovereign state: United Kingdom
- Post town: Canterbury
- Postcode district: CT4
- Dialling code: 01233
- Police: Kent
- Fire: Kent
- Ambulance: South East Coast
- UK Parliament: Weald of Kent
- Website: Molash Parish Council

Molash is a civil parish and village in Kent, South East England. It contains a small part of an Area of Outstanding Natural Beauty (AONB) - the North Downs - and is on the A252 road between Canterbury, Ashford and Faversham. Each of these is centred 7–8 miles (11–13 km) away.

== Geography ==
Molash is a scattered semi-rural community characterised by its own farmland and a borderland forest called King's Wood almost all part of the higher, more wooded village, Godmersham, which was historically a royal hunting forest. The hunt was for deer, and a large herd of Fallow Deer still run free in the wood. The far south is well-marked and maintained as the Pilgrims' Way and North Downs Way pass through the forest as they follow the ridge of the North Downs.

== Amenities ==
In the village, St. Peter's Church, built in the 13th century, with a Norman font and mostly 14th-century stained glass windows, was probably built on the site of an earlier church. The Yew trees in the churchyard are 2,000 years old.

== Transport ==
The village is centred on the North Downs - on the A252 road between Canterbury, Ashford and Faversham, each 7–8 miles (11–13 km) away.

== In popular culture ==
Author Russell Hoban repurposes Molash as "Moal Arse" in his 1980, post apocalyptic novel Riddley Walker.

== See also ==
- Listed buildings in Molash
