= Sojan Joseph =

British politician

Sojan Joseph MP
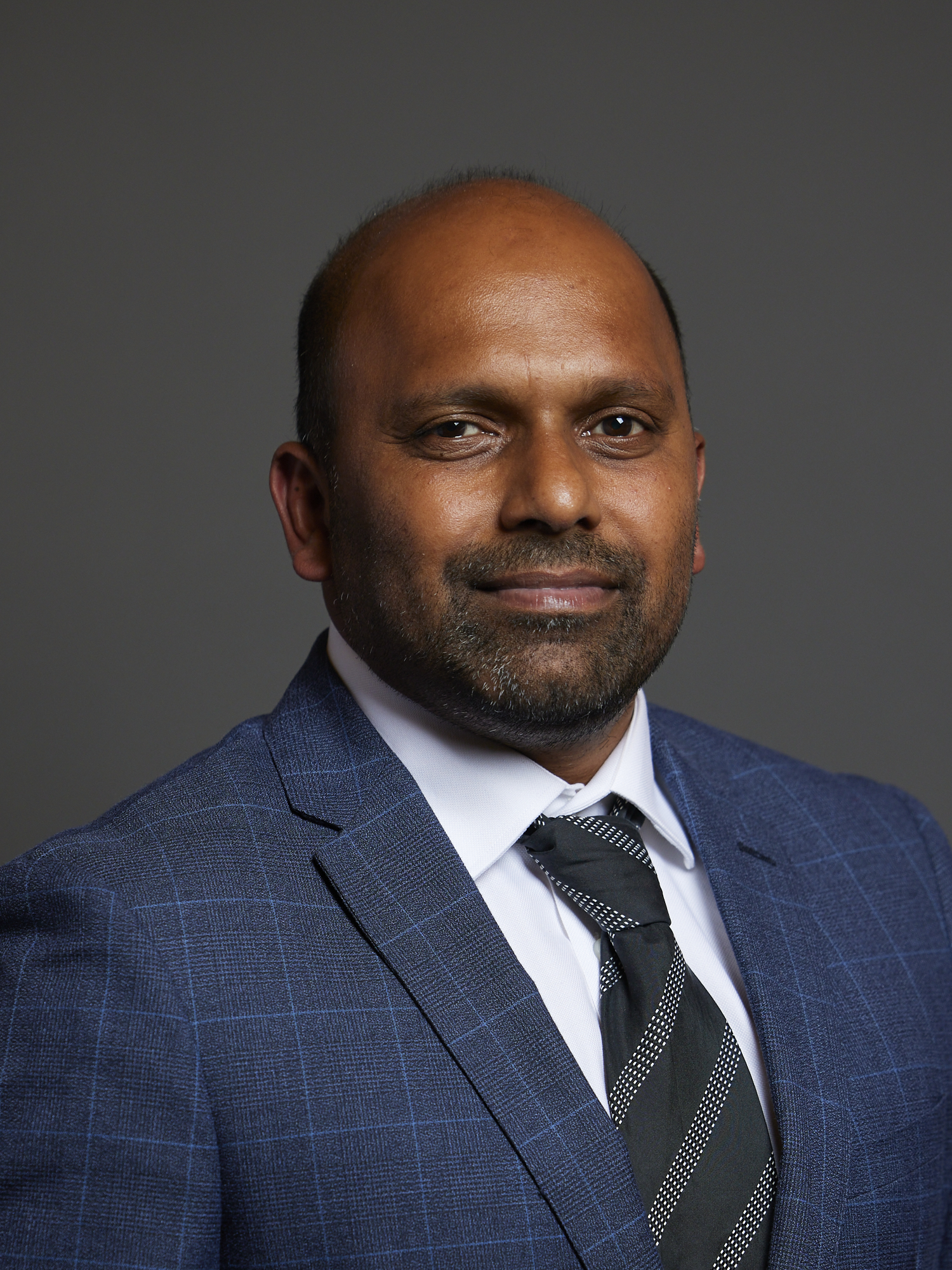
- Official portrait, 2024

Member of Parliament for Ashford
- Incumbent
- Assumed office 4 July 2024
- Preceded by: Damian Green
- Constituency: Ashford
- Majority: 1,779 (3.8%)

Member of Ashford Borough Council for Aylesford & East Stour
- In office May 2023 – September 2024

Personal details
- Born: Kerala, India
- Party: Labour

Sojan Joseph (born September 1983) is a British–Indian politician and nurse who has been Member of Parliament (MP) for Ashford since 2024. He is a member of the Labour Party and previously served as a councillor on Ashford Borough Council.

== Early life and nursing career ==
Joseph was born in the Indian state of Kerala. He emigrated to England and worked as a mental health nurse in the National Health Service. Before his election to parliament, Joseph was the head of nursing for community mental health services at Kent and Medway NHS and Social Care Partnership Trust.

== Political career ==
In May 2023, Joseph was elected as a Labour councillor for the Aylesford & East Stour ward of Ashford Borough Council. He stood down as councillor in September 2024, and Labour lost the seat to the Green Party in the subsequent by-election.

In the 2024 general election, Joseph was elected Member of Parliament (MP) for Ashford with 15,262 votes (32.5%) and a majority of 1,779. On 23 July 2024, he made his maiden speech in the House of Commons during a debate on immigration and home affairs.

Joseph opposed Kim Leadbeater's bill introducing assisted dying into law and served on the committee examining the legislation.

Parliament of the United Kingdom
Preceded by Damian Green	Member of Parliament for Ashford; 2024–present	Incumbent
