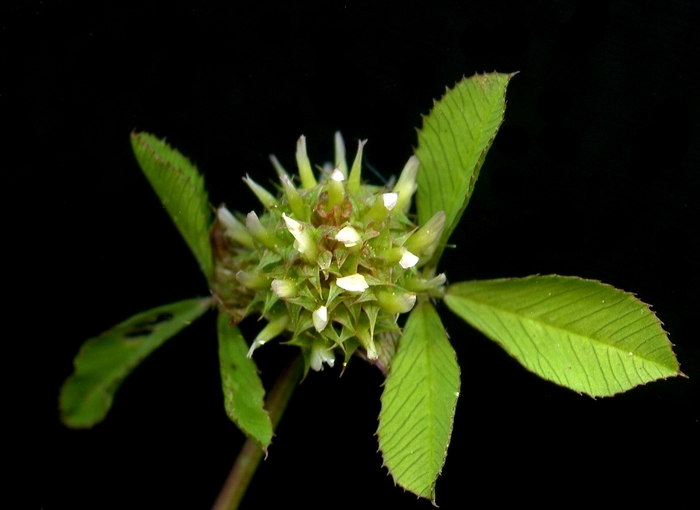

Scientific classification
- Kingdom: Plantae
- Clade: Embryophytes
- Clade: Tracheophytes
- Clade: Spermatophytes
- Clade: Angiosperms
- Clade: Eudicots
- Clade: Rosids
- Order: Fabales
- Family: Fabaceae
- Subfamily: Faboideae
- Genus: Trifolium
- Species: T. glomeratum

Binomial name
- Trifolium glomeratum L.

= Trifolium glomeratum =

Species of flowering plant

Trifolium glomeratum is a species of clover known by the common names clustered clover and bush clover.

== Description ==
It is an annual herb growing decumbent to upright in form with mostly hairless herbage. The leaves are made up of oval leaflets up to 1.2 centimeters (1/2 in) in length. The inflorescences occur in leaf axils, each a cluster of many flowers resembling a flowerhead. Each flower has a calyx of sepals with triangular points that bend outward and a pink corolla.

== Distribution and habitat ==
It is native to Eurasia and North Africa and it is known elsewhere as an introduced species. It easily takes hold in disturbed areas, becoming a common weed.
