= Finberry =

Housing estate in Ashford, Kent, England

Coordinates: 51.125°N 0.898°E

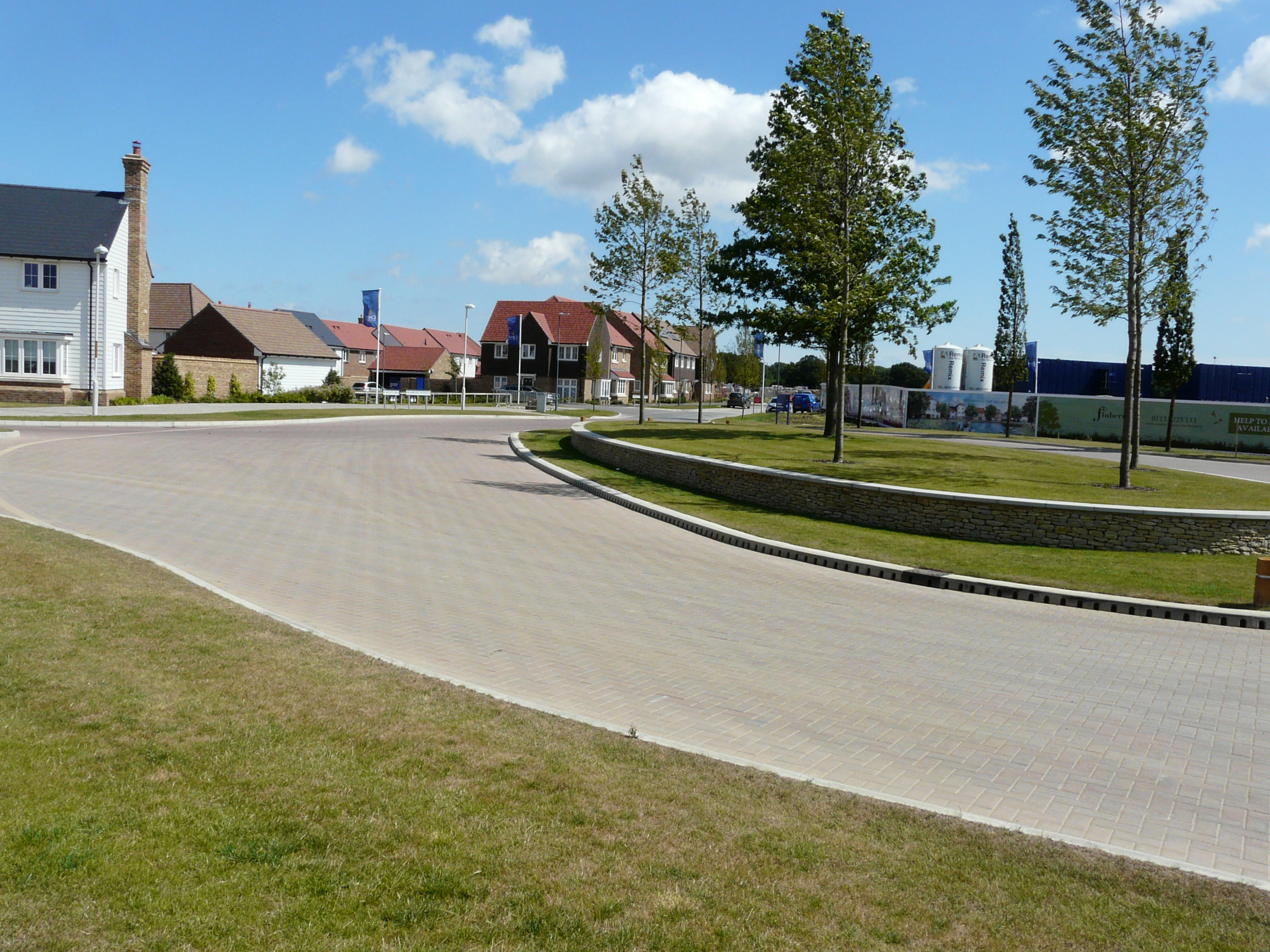

- Location within Kent
- Population: 1,570
- Civil parish: Sevington with Finberry
- District: Ashford
- Shire county: Kent
- Region: South East
- Country: England
- Sovereign state: United Kingdom
- Post town: ASHFORD
- Postcode district: TN25
- Dialling code: 01233
- Police: Kent
- Fire: Kent
- Ambulance: South East Coast
- UK Parliament: Ashford

Finberry is a housing estate located in the south-east of Ashford, in the civil parish of Sevington with Finberry, in the Ashford district, in the county of Kent, England. The population of the housing estate is included in the civil parish of Mersham. The nearest existing places to the housing estate are Sevington to the north, Willesborough to the north-west, and Park Farm. The housing estate was opened by the Mayor of Ashford in June 2014. Finberry Primary School opened 2017.

== Development ==
The 168 hectare development site will eventually contain 1,180 homes, making it the largest single development in Ashford since 2002. The site was originally known as Cheeseman's Green.

== Transport ==
A "SMARTLINK" bus link is proposed between the new development and Ashford's town centre, also linking with the Orbital Business Park, Waterbrook, the Newtown Railway works, Designer Outlet and the International railway station. The scheme aims to provide journey times matching or beating car journey times and a high frequency, competitively priced reliable service.
