= Sevington =

Suburb of Ashford, Kent, England

Coordinates: 51.128°N 0.908°E

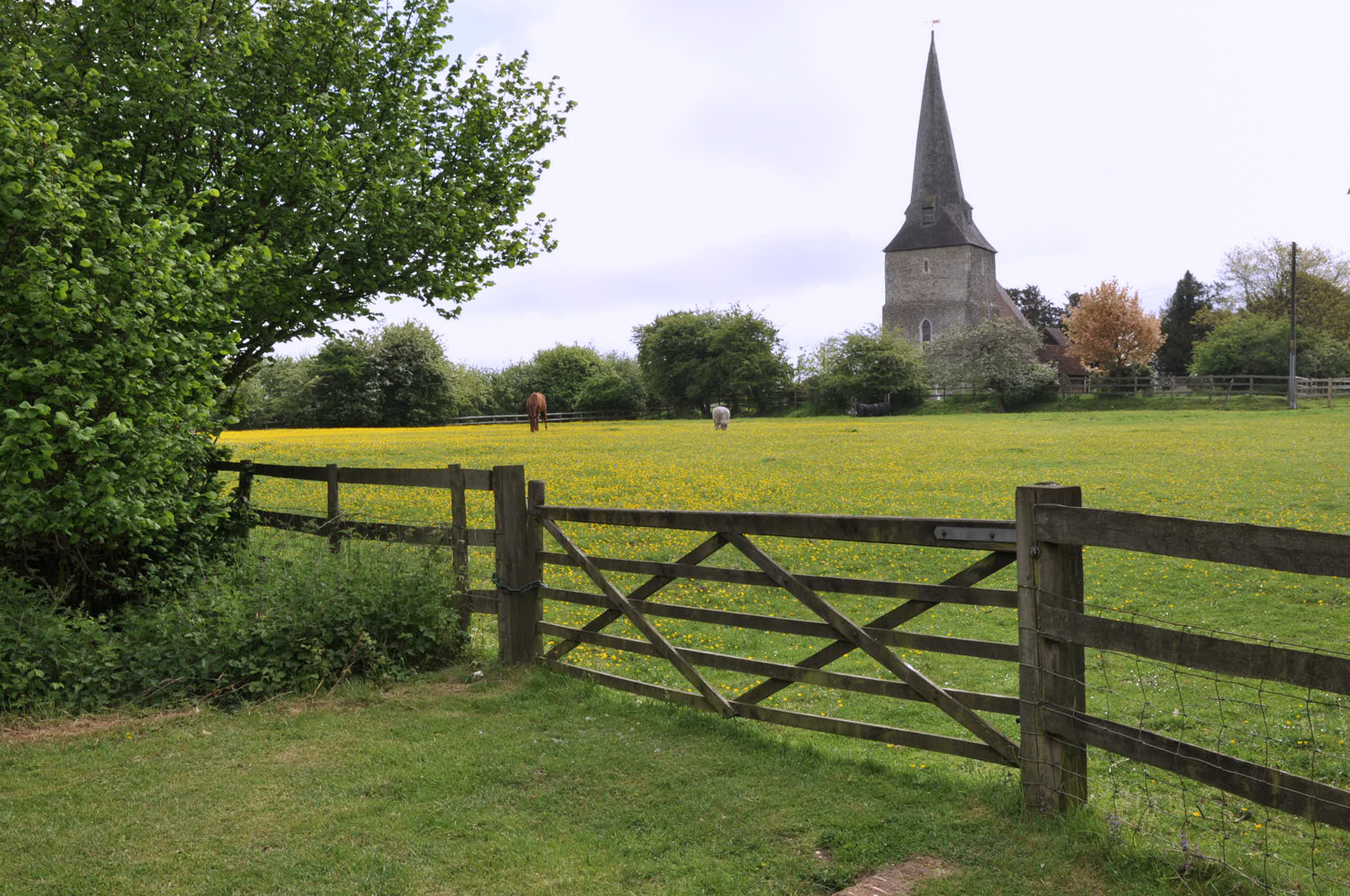
- St Mary's Church, Sevington

- Location within Kent
- Interactive map of Sevington
- Area: 0.76 km^{2} (0.29 sq mi)
- Population: 310 (Civil Parish 2011)
  - Density: 408/km^{2} (1,060/sq mi)
- OS grid reference: TR0340
- Civil parish: Sevington with Finberry
- District: Ashford
- Shire county: Kent
- Region: South East
- Country: England
- Sovereign state: United Kingdom
- Post town: Ashford
- Postcode district: TN24
- Dialling code: 01233
- Police: Kent
- Fire: Kent
- Ambulance: South East Coast
- UK Parliament: Ashford

Sevington (/ˈsɛvɪŋtən/) is a village in the civil parish of Sevington with Finberry, in the Ashford district, in Kent, England.

== History ==
The geographically small village of Sevington is first recorded in the Domesday Book of 1086, where it appears as Seivetone. It appears as Seyueton in the Feet of Fines for 1314. The name means "the town or settlement of Sægifu", Sægifu being a woman's name.

In 1872, the village had a population of about 113.

St Mary's Church is the village's Norman parish church. It is a Grade I listed building dating from the 12th century, and has been altered at several times, first around 1200 and a second time in the 14th century, and underwent restoration in 1877 and 1936. The church is cut off from the village by the building of the Southern Orbital road.

== Geography and economy ==
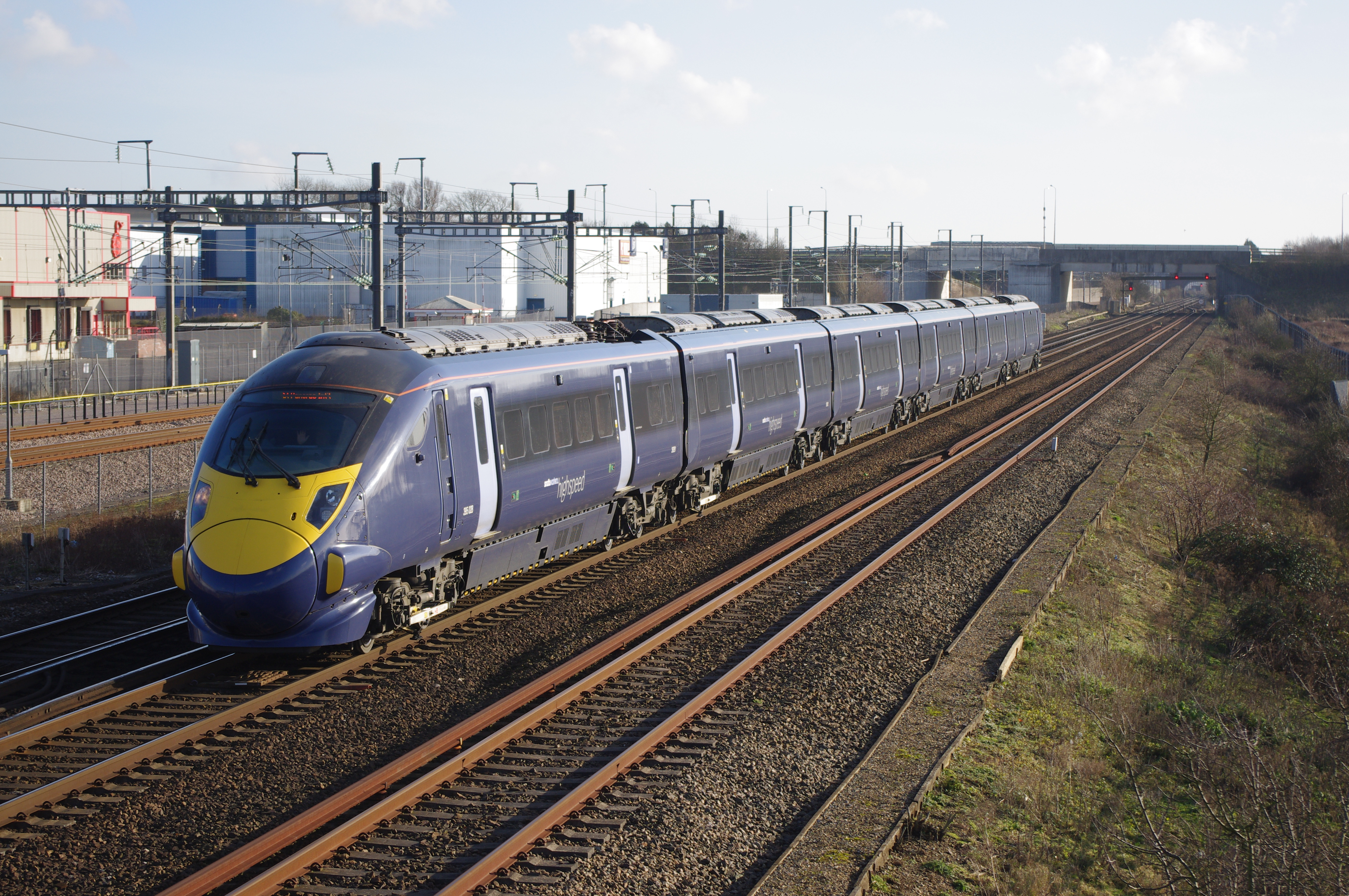
Sevington on the Southeastern Main Line.

Much of Sevington's small tract of land is covered by Ashford business park areas which are connected with Ashford by post town status and by its road network, linking them closely with Ashford.

At the start of the 21st century many changes took place in Sevington due to the building of the Orbital Business Park including the Ashford livestock market.

The village/suburb of Willesborough bounds Sevington (along its long north-west border), while the new Finberry neighbourhood is to the south in Mersham but with its own amenities. High Speed 1, the Channel Tunnel Rail Link which adjoins the ordinary railway, passes through the parish.

=== Customs clearance facility ===
In 2019, a 11-hectare (27-acre) tract of former farmland at Sevington was put up for sale for property development. Located close to Junction 10A of the M20 motorway, it was marketed as MOJO, an acronym for M20, Junction 10a), In July 2020, the UK Government announced that it had acquired the MOJO site to develop it as a customs clearance facility for inbound freight and a holding area for outbound freight, in preparation for the withdrawal of the United Kingdom from the European Union. The site was selected due to its proximity to the Port of Dover. The facility has been nicknamed in the media as "the Farage Garage", in reference to the politician Nigel Farage, who has been one of the leading campaigners for Brexit. In 2020, commentators in the media said that the 13th-century Church of St Mary will be surrounded by the planned lorry park.

As at mid-December 2020, it was forecast to be finished by late February 2021. Although originally intended to be finished by 1 January 2021, heavy rain delayed construction; as a result, the site was temporarily only used as a holding area, with customs checks being performed in Waterbrook Park nearby.

In January 2023, the facility was completed but was not in any significant use. The Government had repeatedly postponed introduction of import controls, with no firm plans to begin such. In July 2023, the Government announced that application of controls on all goods arriving from the EU that are subject to sanitary and phytosanitary (SPS) controls, would begin in autumn 2023.

As of August 2026 the Government has announced plans to scale back the facility in preparation to move customs checks to the Port of Dover in early 2027. The plan has faced criticism from members of the Ashford Borough Council, Councillor Paul Bartlett was quoted as being “dumbstruck” and believed the site would eventually close. This is despite the Government saying that the site will “remain operational until further notice”.

== See also ==
- Listed buildings in Sevington
