= Godinton =

Suburb of Ashford, Kent, England

Coordinates: 51.1524°N 0.8465°E

- Location within Kent
- Population: 4,600 (2005); 6,238 (Ward. 2011)
- OS grid reference: TQ990431
- Civil parish: Ashford town civil parish
- District: Ashford
- Shire county: Kent
- Region: South East
- Country: England
- Sovereign state: United Kingdom
- Post town: Ashford
- Postcode district: TN23
- Dialling code: 01233
- Police: Kent
- Fire: Kent
- Ambulance: South East Coast
- UK Parliament: Ashford

Godinton (sometimes known as Godinton Park) is a suburb of Ashford, Kent in England, with its stately home Godinton House within its outskirts.

Godinton is located between Great Chart, Hothfield and the town of Ashford proper.

The Orpington suburb of Goddington is named (indirectly) after the village, as lands near Orpington were owned by Godinton-based Simon de Godyngton in the 13th century.

== Demography ==
Godinton compared
2001 UK Census	Godinton	Ashford district	England
Population	3,933	102,661	49,138,831
Foreign born	6.7%	5.5%	9.2%
White	97.1%	97.6%	90.9%
Asian	1.6%	0.9%	4.6%
Black	0.3%	0.4%	2.3%
Christian	75.5%	76.5%	71.7%
Muslim	0.7%	0.6%	3.1%
Hindu	0.4%	0.3%	1.1%
No religion	14.7%	14.6%	14.6%
Unemployed	2.4%	2.4%	3.3%
Retired	10.6%	13.8%	13.5%

At the 2001 UK census, the Godinton electoral ward had a population of 3,933. The ethnicity was 97.1% white, 0.7% mixed race, 1.6% Asian, 0.3% black and 0.3% other. The place of birth of residents was 93.3% United Kingdom, 0.8% Republic of Ireland, 2.1% other Western European countries, and 3.8% elsewhere. Religion was recorded as 75.5% Christian, 0.4% Buddhist, 0.4% Hindu, 0% Sikh, 0% Jewish, and 0.7% Muslim. 14.7% were recorded as having no religion, 0.5% had an alternative religion and 7.8% did not state their religion.

The economic activity of residents aged 16–74 was 50.4% in full-time employment, 13.8% in part-time employment, 6.8% self-employed, 2.4% unemployed, 2.6% students with jobs, 3% students without jobs, 10.6% retired, 6% looking after home or family, 2.3% permanently sick or disabled and 2% economically inactive for other reasons. The industry of employment of residents was 20.3% retail, 14.7% manufacturing, 8.5% construction, 9.9% real estate, 10.3% health and social work, 6% education, 8.7% transport and communications, 7.2% public administration, 4% hotels and restaurants, 4.2% finance, 0.6% agriculture and 5.6% other. Compared with national figures, the ward had a relatively high proportion of workers in public administration, construction, transport and communications. There were a relatively low proportion in education, agriculture and real estate. Of the ward's residents aged 16–74, 14.8% had a higher education qualification or the equivalent, compared with 19.9% nationwide.

During 2015 a seven-day per week (and evenings) bus service was introduced for the first time. The circuitous G Line links the estate with the town centre, railway station and South Willesborough. The route taken through the Estate is one-way which means that one is often, initially, taken further away from the desired destination.
