= Stanhope, Kent =

Suburb of Ashford, Kent, England

Coordinates: 51.1315°N 0.8538°E

Stanhope
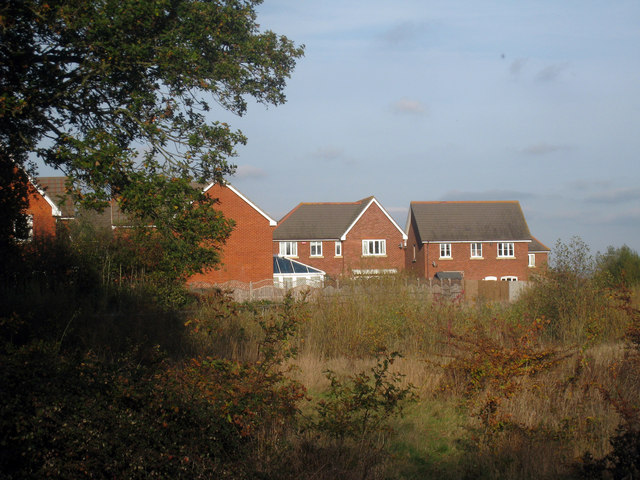
- Housing estate (2009)

- Location within Kent
- Area: 0.58 km^{2} (0.22 sq mi)
- Population: 4,068 (civil parish 2011)
  - Density: 7,014/km^{2} (18,170/sq mi)
- OS grid reference: TQ996408
- Civil parish: Stanhope
- District: Ashford
- Shire county: Kent
- Region: South East
- Country: England
- Sovereign state: United Kingdom
- Post town: Ashford
- Postcode district: TN23
- Dialling code: 01233
- Police: Kent
- Fire: Kent
- Ambulance: South East Coast
- UK Parliament: Ashford

Stanhope is a civil parish and suburb of Ashford in the Borough of Ashford in Kent, England. It was built in the 1960s on the southern edge of the town.

== Demography ==
Stanhope compared
2001 UK Census	Stanhope Ward	Ashford district	England
Population	3,276	102,661	49,138,831
Foreign born	6.5%	5.5%	9.2%
White	94.2%	97.6%	90.9%
Asian	1.6%	0.9%	4.6%
Black	1%	0.4%	2.3%
Christian	65.9%	76.5%	71.7%
Muslim	3.1%	0.6%	3.1%
Hindu	0%	0.3%	1.1%
No religion	21.2%	14.6%	14.6%
Unemployed	6.8%	2.4%	3.3%
Retired	6.9%	13.8%	13.5%

At the 2001 UK census, the Stanhope electoral ward had a population of 3,276. The ethnicity was 94.2% white, 1.4% mixed race, 1.6% Asian, 1% black and 1.8% other. The place of birth of residents was 93.5% United Kingdom, 0.7% Republic of Ireland, 0.9% other Western European countries, and 4.9% elsewhere. Religion was recorded as 65.9% Christian, 0% Buddhist, 0% Hindu, 0% Sikh, 0% Jewish, and 3.1% Muslim. 21.2% were recorded as having no religion, 0.3% had an alternative religion and 9.5% did not state their religion.

The economic activity of residents aged 16–74 was 38.3% in full-time employment, 12% in part-time employment, 4.3% self-employed, 6.8% unemployed, 2.6% students with jobs, 4% students without jobs, 6.9% retired, 13.1% looking after home or family, 8.1% permanently sick or disabled and 3.9% economically inactive for other reasons. The industry of employment of residents was 21.2% retail, 18% manufacturing, 9.6% construction, 8.4% real estate, 11.6% health and social work, 5.6% education, 7.9% transport and communications, 2.6% public administration, 4.9% hotels and restaurants, 2.3% finance, 2.1% agriculture and 5.8% other. Compared with national figures, the ward had a relatively high proportion of workers in agriculture, retail, manufacturing and construction. There were a relatively low proportion in finance, real estate, education and public administration. Of the ward's residents aged 16–74, 7% had a higher education qualification or the equivalent, compared with 19.9% nationwide.

== History ==
The parish was formed in 1987 from the parish of Kingsnorth and part of the unparished area of Ashford.
