= Singleton, Kent =

Suburb of Ashford, Kent, England

Coordinates: 51.1409°N 0.8372°E

Singleton
- Location within Kent
- Population: 4,206 (2001) (Parish)
- OS grid reference: TQ987413
- Civil parish: Great Chart with Singleton
- District: Ashford
- Shire county: Kent
- Region: South East
- Country: England
- Sovereign state: United Kingdom
- Post town: ASHFORD
- Postcode district: TN23
- Dialling code: 01233
- Police: Kent
- Fire: Kent
- Ambulance: South East Coast
- UK Parliament: Ashford

Singleton is a suburb of Ashford in Kent, South East England, first developed in the 1980s. Although Singleton forms a contiguous urban area with the large town of Ashford to its east, it is formally a part of Great Chart with Singleton civil parish (Where the population is included).

== Amenities ==
There are several amenities around Hoxton Close including the primary school, village hall, the Singleton Centre shopping parade and the Singleton Barn, a Grade II listed former tithe barn now converted into a Shepherd Neame pub.

== Transport ==
Singleton is served by Stagecoach bus route A.

== Nature ==
Ashford Green Corridor, a Local Nature Reserve, includes Singleton Lake, a man made fishing lake in the area.

Singleton Environment Centre opened in June 2008 and provides a full and imaginative programme of activities catering for people of all ages from both the local community and visitors to Ashford.

Activities include environmental, conservation and educational activities, fitness classes, holistic health treatments, arts and entertainment and community events.

The centre serves as a local attraction and environmental education resource for local primary schools and a growing number of environmental groups and projects in the borough of Ashford.
