= Ashford Designer Outlet =

McArthur Glen Designer Outlet
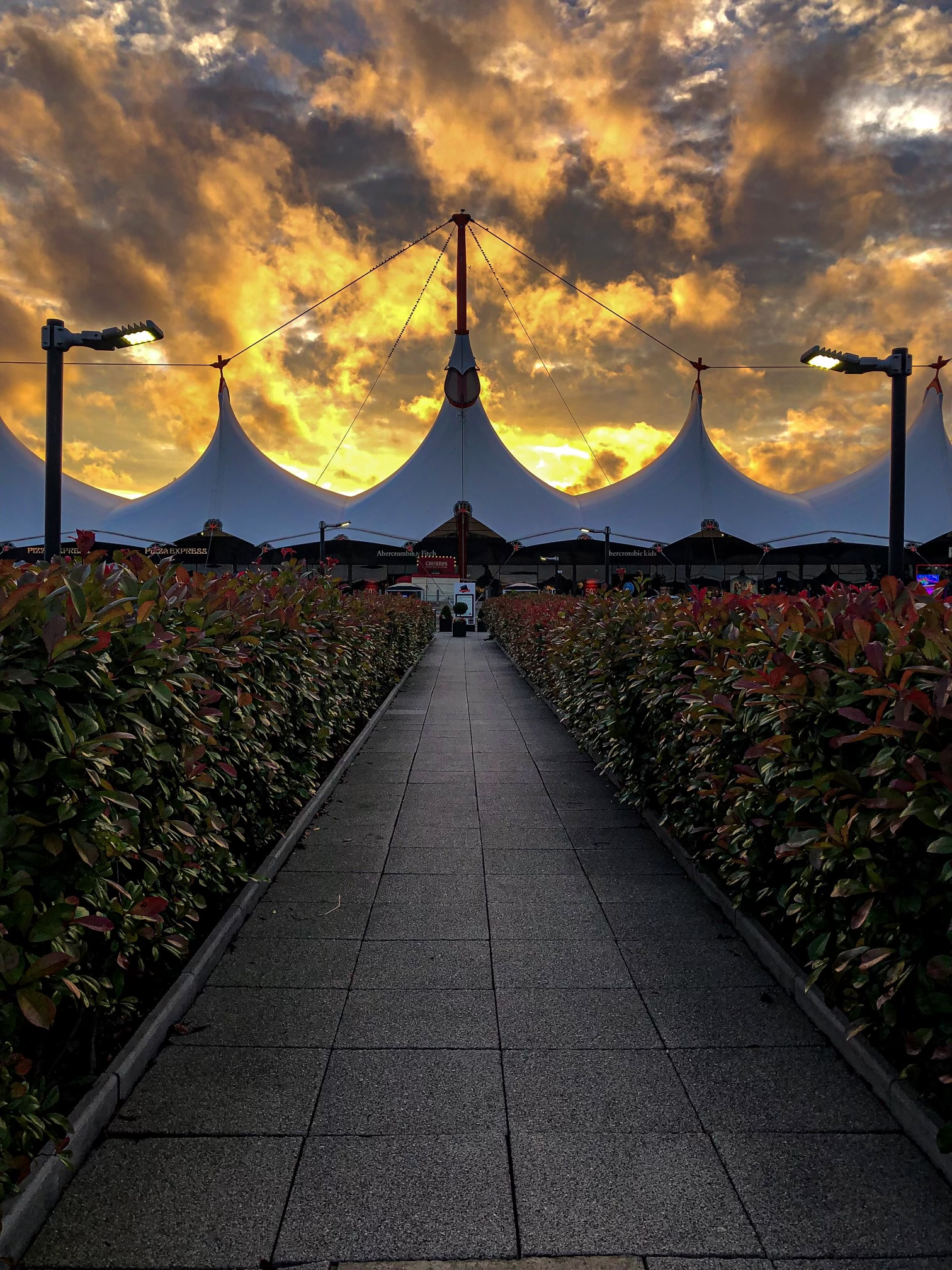
- Interactive map of the McArthur Glen Designer Outlet area

General information
- Type: Shopping Centre
- Location: Ashford, Kent, England
- Coordinates: 51°08′11″N 0°52′39″E
- Completed: 2000; 26 years ago
- Cost: £21,000,000

Height
- Roof: 24 m (79 ft)

Design and construction
- Architect: Richard Rogers Partnership
- Structural engineer: Buro Happold
- Civil engineer: Buro Happold / Arup
- Quantity surveyor: Davis Langdon & Everest

The Ashford Designer Outlet is a shopping centre in Ashford, Kent, England.

The McArthurGlen Ashford Designer Outlet was designed by the Richard Rogers Partnership and engineers Buro Happold, and opened in March 2000. There are over 120 designer brands located at the shopping outlet.

On 15 November 2013, the Ashford Designer Outlet confirmed plans to almost double in size. In early 2018, extensive work began to allow new establishments, which was completed in November 2019. In 2020 the biggest European green wall (a wall covered in plants and vegetation) was added to the designer outlet, as part of an overall £90 million expansion to add 100,000 additional square feet of retail space.

== History ==
In July 1991, the name Ashford Meadows Leisure Park was for a planning document submitted to the Ashford borough council. The mall was designed by Lord Richard Rogers of Rogers Stirk Harbour + Partners, and work began around 1996.

In March 2000, BBC presenter Charlie Dimmock cut the ribbon on the property and it opened to visitors. Within a year, the outlet won Retail Destination of the Year and other industry accolades. The architectural canopy stretched over 300 metres—one of the largest of its kind in Europe. There was discussion of almost doubling the original 185,000 square feet of retail space in 2013. In September 2015, councilors on the council "voted overwhelmingly" in favor of a planning application to expand the property. Construction began in late 2017. According to KentOnline, the construction shut down Newtown Road for several months, resulting in "controversy," as well as the closure of the original food court.

In May 2019, a new £400,000 playground was opened at the mall, with space for up to 200 children, as part of an overall £90 million expansion to add 100,000 additional square feet of retail space. The full extension opened in November 2019, with new stores including Coach, Sandro, Maje and Karl Lagerfeld. Among various art features, it added a "living wall" installation with plants vertically growing across 25,000 square feet of walls, which the store called the "largest" such wall in Europe.

Non-essential stores re-opened in April 2021. Reported KentOnline, the mall ordinarily saw 10,000 visitors each day, but had been empty for some time due to the coronavirus lockdown.

In February 2021, there was some controversy when McArthurGlen management asked the Ashford Borough Council to "relax planning regulations which currently force the site’s new restaurants to close at 7.30pm." Older existing outlets at the mall were allowed to close at 9pm, with the mall arguing the mall consistently received its lowest ratings for food, and it needed to extend seating and food options for late shoppers. Managers of the nearby town center argued that allowing the mall restaurants to stay open would have "the potential to encourage visitors of the Outlet to remain there rather than going into the town centre during the evening.... No evidence has been submitted to robustly demonstrate there will not be a significant adverse impact on the town centre." President of the Kent Invicta Chamber of Commerce instead argued increased traffic overall would enhance "the offer of Ashford as a town."
