= Borough of Ashford =

Coordinates: 51.1465°N 0.8676°E

- Non-metropolitan district and borough
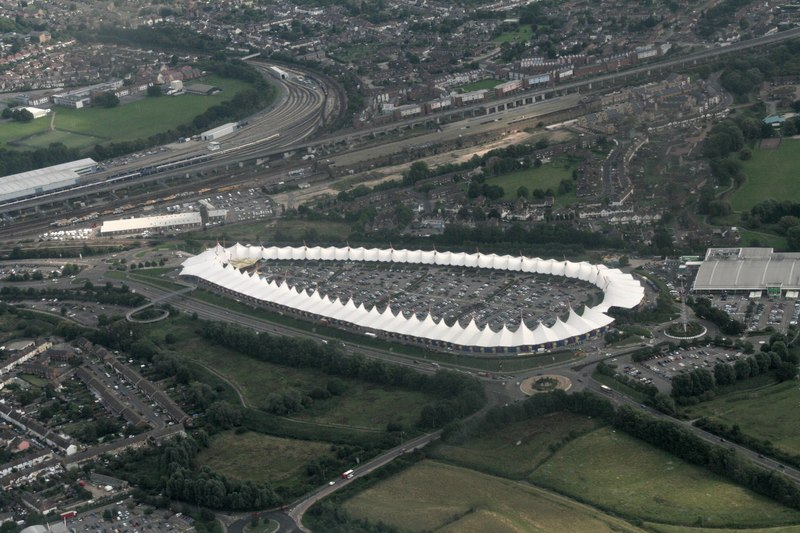
- Aerial view of Ashford Designer Outlet

- Coat of arms

- Ashford shown within Kent
- Sovereign state: United Kingdom
- Constituent country: England
- Region: South East England
- Non-metropolitan county: Kent
- Status: Non-metropolitan district, Borough
- Admin HQ: Ashford
- Incorporated: 1 April 1974

Government
  - Type: Non-metropolitan district council
  - Body: Ashford Borough Council
  - MPs: Sojan Joseph

Area
  - Total: 224.18 sq mi (580.62 km^{2})
  - Rank: 64th (of 296)

Population (2024)
  - Total: 140,936
  - Rank: 169th (of 296)
  - Density: 628.68/sq mi (242.73/km^{2})

Ethnicity (2021)
  - Ethnic groups: List: 88.1% White; 5.8% Asian; 2.6% Black; 2.2% Mixed; 1.4% other

Religion (2021)
  - Religion: List: 47.6% Christianity; 40.7% no religion; 5.7% not stated; 2% Hinduism; 1.6% Islam; 1.2% other; 1% Buddhism; 0.1% Sikhism; 0.1% Judaism
- Time zone: UTC0 (GMT)
  - Summer (DST): UTC+1 (BST)
- ONS code: 29UB (ONS); E07000105 (GSS)
- OS grid reference: TR005425

The Borough of Ashford is a local government district with borough status in Kent, England. It is named after its largest town, Ashford, where the council is based. The borough also includes the town of Tenterden and an extensive surrounding rural area including numerous villages; with an area of 580 square kilometres (220 sq mi), it is the largest district in Kent. Parts of the borough lie within the designated Areas of Outstanding Natural Beauty of High Weald and the Kent Downs.

The neighbouring districts are (clockwise from west) Tunbridge Wells, Maidstone, Swale, Canterbury, Folkestone and Hythe, and Rother. The latter is in East Sussex, the rest are in Kent.

== History ==
The parish of Ashford was made a local government district in 1863, run by an elected local board. Such districts were converted into urban districts under the Local Government Act 1894.

The modern district was created on 1 April 1974 under the Local Government Act 1972, covering the area of five former districts, which were all abolished at the same time:

- Ashford Urban District
- East Ashford Rural District
- Tenterden Rural District
- Tenterden Municipal Borough
- West Ashford Rural District

The new district was named Ashford after its largest town. The district was awarded borough status from its creation, allowing the chair of the council to take the title of mayor.

Under current local government reorganisation plans, all district councils in Kent, as well as the county council, will be abolished in 2028, with the borough becoming part of a new Mid Kent unitary authority.

== Governance ==
Ashford Borough Council

Type
- Type: Non-metropolitan district

History
- Founded: 1 April 1974

Leadership
- Mayor: Winston Michael, Ashford Independents since 21 May 2026
- Leader: Noel Ovenden, Ashford Independents since 30 May 2023
- Chief Executive: Tracey Kerly since 2016

Structure
- Seats: 47 councillors
- Political groups: Administration (21) Green (12) Ashford Ind. (9) Other parties (26) Conservative (16) Labour (7) Independent (3)

Elections
- Voting system: First past the post
- Last election: 4 May 2023

Meeting place
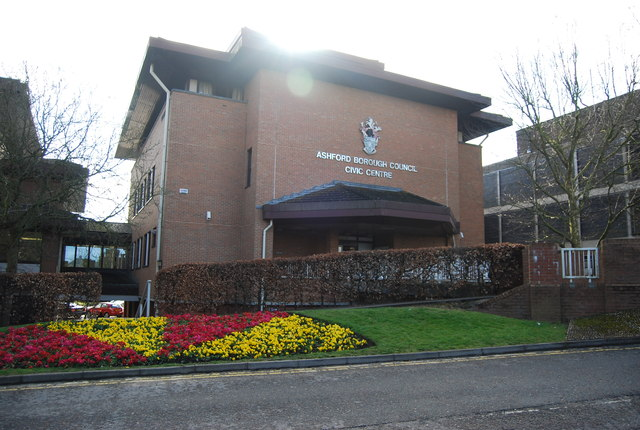
- Civic Centre, Tannery Lane, Ashford, TN23 1PL

Website
- www.ashford.gov.uk

Ashford Borough Council provides district-level services. County-level services are provided by Kent County Council. Much of the district is covered by civil parishes, which form a third tier of local government for their areas.

=== Political control ===
The council has been under no overall control since 2022. Following the 2023 election a coalition of the Ashford Independents and the Green Party took minority control of the council, led by Ashford Independent councillor Noel Ovenden.

The first elections to the council were held in 1973, initially operating as a shadow authority alongside the outgoing authorities until the new arrangements came into effect on 1 April 1974. Political control of the council since 1974 has been as follows:

Party in control	Years
No overall control	1974–1976
Conservative	1976–1979
No overall control	1979–1983
Conservative	1983–1995
No overall control	1995–2003
Conservative	2003–2022
No overall control	2022–present

=== Leadership ===
The role of mayor is largely ceremonial in Ashford. Political leadership is instead provided by the leader of the council. The leaders since 1999 have been:

Councillor	Party	From	To
Paul Clokie	Conservative	1999	13 May 2010
Paul Bartlett	Conservative	13 May 2010	9 Nov 2010
Peter Wood	Conservative	9 Nov 2010	1 Mar 2013
Gerry Clarkson	Conservative	18 Apr 2013	May 2023
Noel Ovenden	Ashford Independents	30 May 2023	

=== Compositions ===
Following the 2023 election, subsequent changes of allegiance and by-elections up to May 2026, the composition of the council was:

Party	Councillors
Conservative	16
Green	12
Ashford Independents	9
Labour	7
Independent	3
Total	47

=== Elections ===
Since the last full review of boundaries in 2019 the council has comprised 47 councillors representing 39 wards, with each ward electing one or two councillors. Elections are held every four years.

=== Premises ===
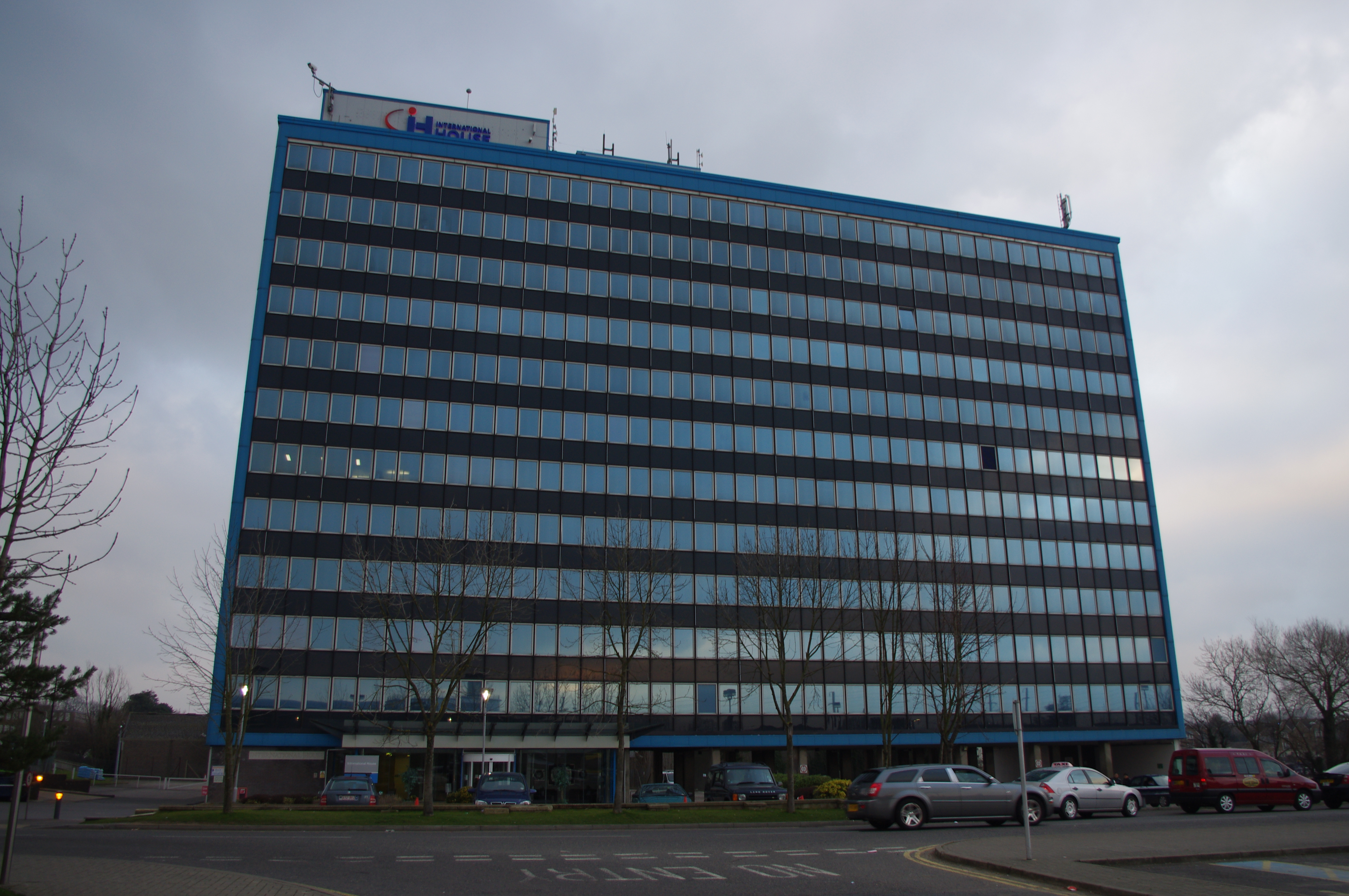
International House, Dover Place, Ashford: Council's main offices

The council has its main offices at International House, an office block built in 1972 opposite Ashford International railway station, which the council bought in 2014, initially renting it out to other organisations. The council moved into International House in 2024.

The council was previously based at the Civic Centre on Tannery Lane in Ashford, which was purpose-built for the council and opened in 1983. As at March 2025, council meetings are still being held at the Civic Centre, pending works to incorporate a new council chamber into International House.

== Population ==
=== Expansion and growth ===
In 1961, the population of the districts which make up the present borough was as follows:

District	Population
Ashford Urban District	27,996
East Ashford Rural District	10,610
Tenterden Municipal Borough	10,734
Tenterden Rural District	4,948
West Ashford Rural District	7,626
Total	61,914

Forty years later the population had almost doubled: the 2001 census recorded a population of 102,661.

From the 1960s onwards Ashford has experienced phases of rapid urban growth, creating new suburbs such as Stanhope and, more recently, Singleton. Today's urban growth is partially shaped by the de facto corridors created by the M20 motorway, the High Speed 1 line and several other rail lines which converge on the town's railway station.

The 2011 census reported Ashford as having:

- 117,956 residents
- 47,787 households (an increase of just under 6,000 since 2001)
- 83% of residents describing their health as 'good' or 'very good'
- 13% of residents describing their health as 'fair'
- 16.8% of those over the age of 16 having no qualifications
- an unemployment rate of 2.6% of all economically active people aged 16–74 (an increase since 2001 of 0.2%)

== Economy and infrastructure ==
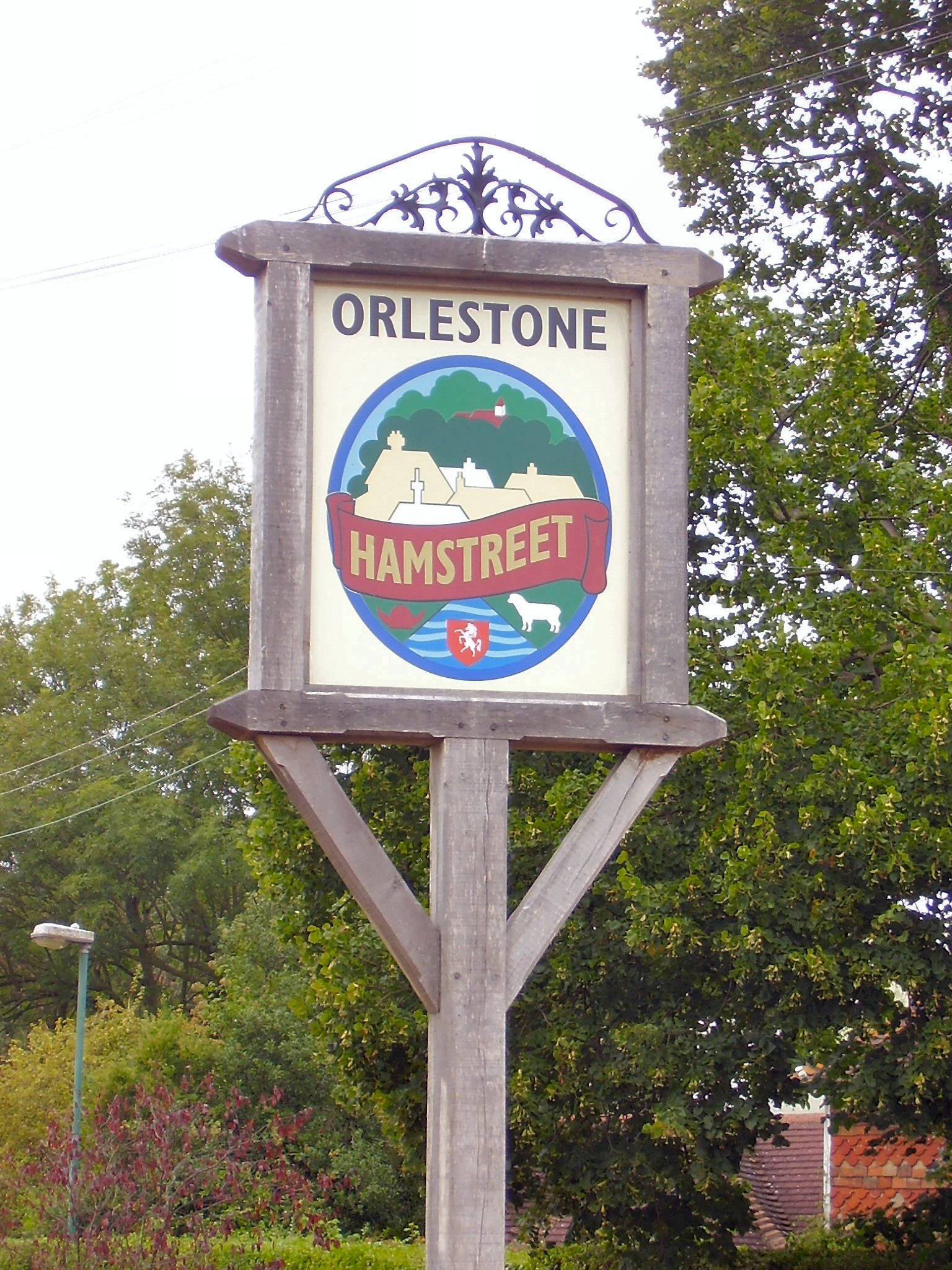
Village sign along the Greensand Way in Ashford borough

The area's economy, once strongly dominated by agriculture and associated activities such as brewing and food production as well as some quarrying of ragstone and brick manufacture, evolved into a centre for rail engineering in the 19th century, and is now primarily light industrial and commercial, with the notable exception of Hitachi's rail depot. The borough's local plan ("Local Plan to 2030") continues to plan for new housing in and around the town, such as the development at Finberry.

From the historic town centre, roads radiate out in the following directions: NW to Charing and Maidstone and SE to Hythe and Folkestone (A20/M20 in each direction); south to Hamstreet, Lydd and Romney Marsh and then westwards to Hastings (A2070); SW to Tenterden and NE to Wye and Canterbury (A28) and finally north to Ashford's historic port at Faversham (A251).

== Media ==
=== Television ===
The area is served by the regional news programmes:

- BBC South East Today
- ITV News Meridian

=== Radio ===
Radio stations that broadcast to the area are:

- BBC Radio Kent
- Heart South
- Gold Radio
- AHBS Community Radio broadcast from the William Harvey Hospital in Ashford.
- KMFM Ashford
- Radio Ashford, a community based station.

== Historic buildings and landscape character ==
There are more than 2400 listed buildings in the district. This includes 33 churches listed in the highest grading in the national listing system (Grade I) as well as many oast houses and pubs dating from the 17th and 18th centuries, along with some even earlier buildings such as the Black Horse at Pluckley built in the 1470s as a dry-moated farmhouse by the Dering family (see also: Little Chart).

Well-known examples of Grade I listed buildings include: the Archbishop's palace at Charing, Chilham Castle and Godinton House, as well as more domestic examples such as the row of 17th century Flemish weavers' cottages which stretches the full length of the south side of Biddenden High Street.

See also the listings: Grade I listed buildings in Ashford (borough) .

Beyond the town of Ashford, most of the borough's land area is rural, with fields, woodland and fruit orchards. Much of the woodland is coppiced. Changes in rural land use over the past century mirror those in the rest of the present County. The north-east of the borough, including the villages of Wye and Chilham, is within the Kent Downs AONB, whilst the south-west, including Rolvenden and the Isle of Oxney, is part of the High Weald AONB. In addition to these national landscape areas, the borough has many smaller Local Nature Reserves such as Hothfield Common.

== Towns and parishes ==
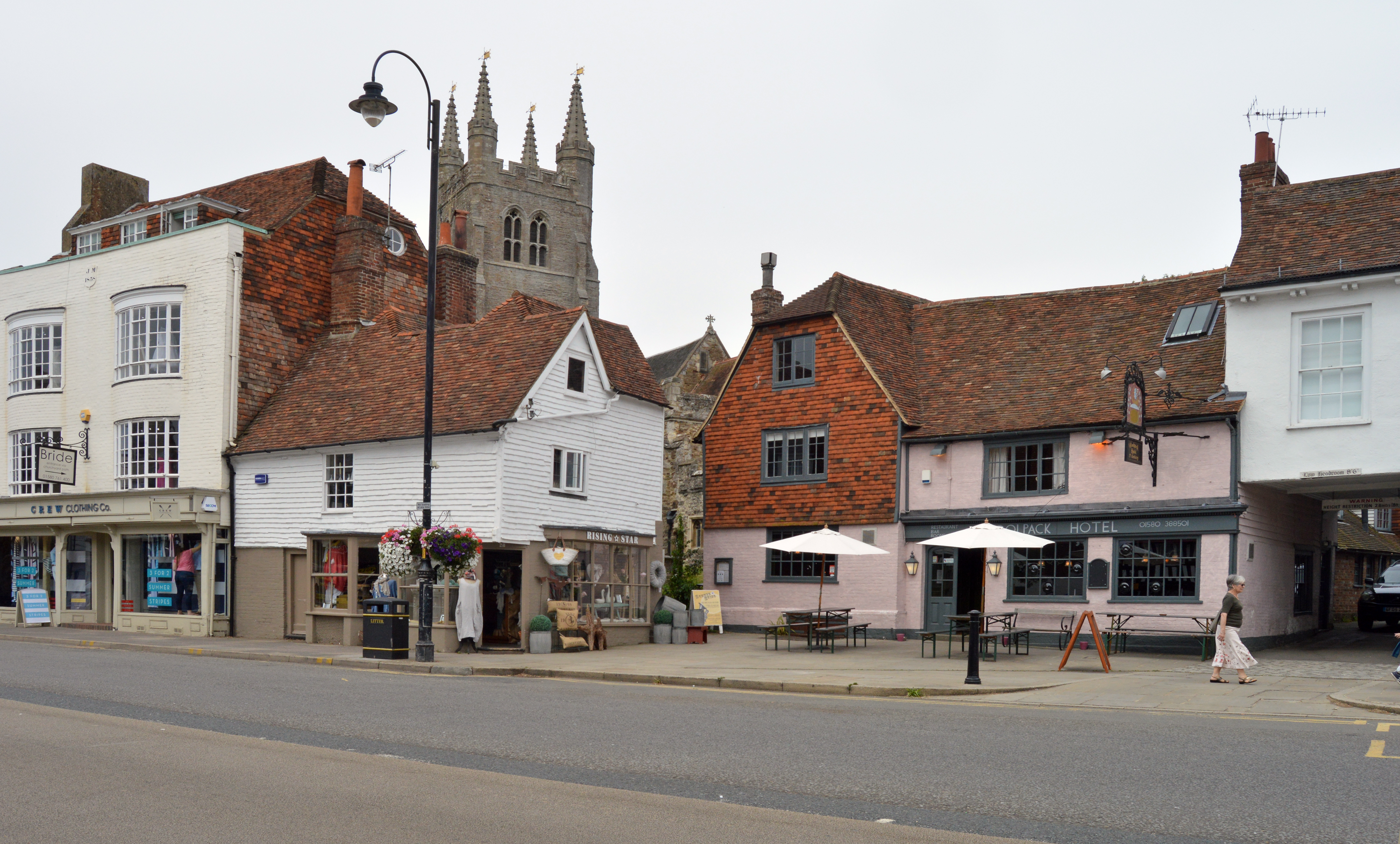
High Street in Tenterden

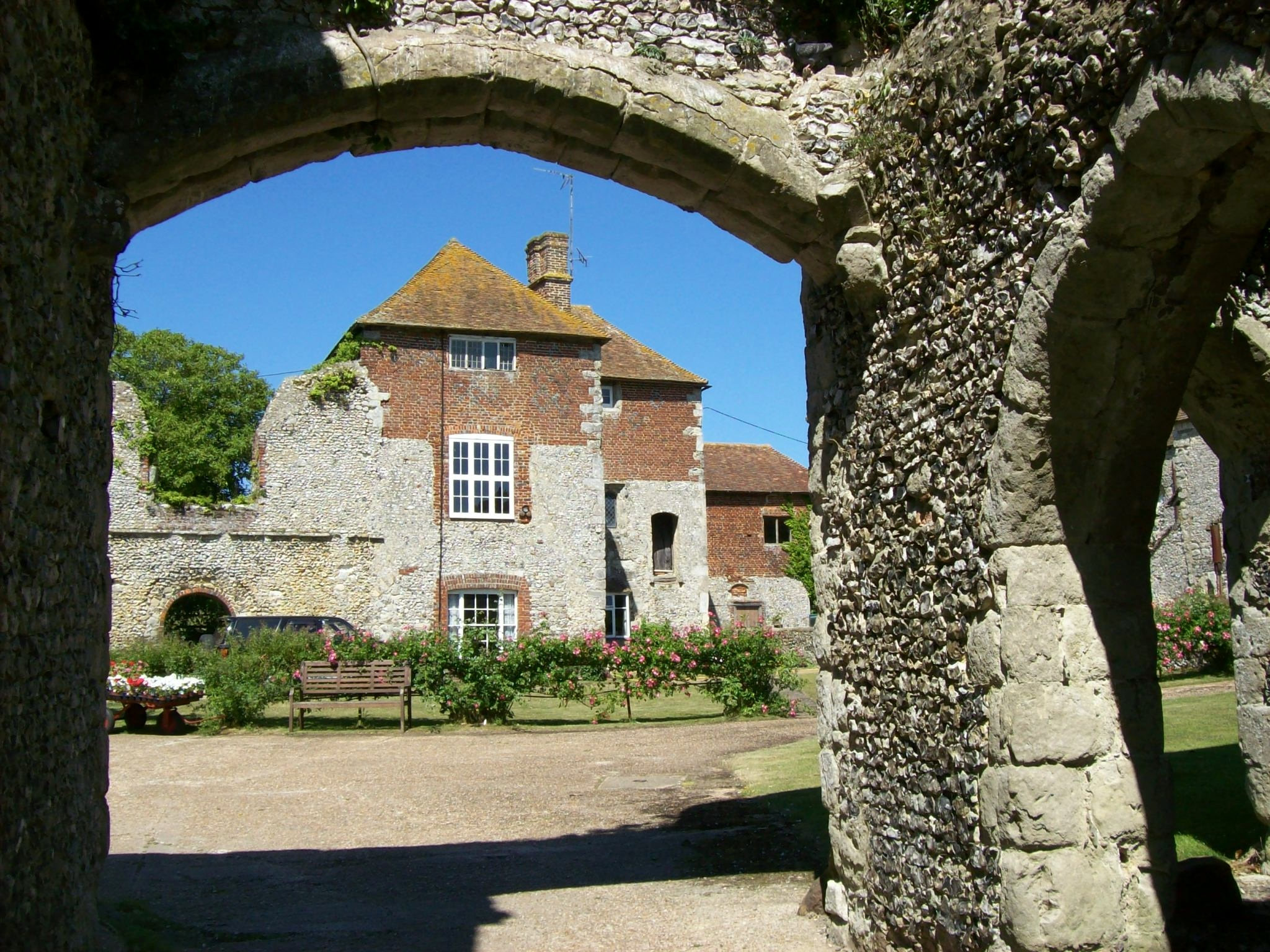
Archbishop's Palace at Charing, one of the borough's villages

As of April 2023 there were 44 civil parishes within the borough. The parish council for Tenterden has declared that parish to be a town, allowing it to take the style "town council". Much of the built-up area of Ashford itself is unparished, although some suburbs fall within parishes.

- Aldington (Note: Shares a grouped parish council with Bonnington)
- Appledore
- Bethersden
- Biddenden
- Bilsington
- Bonnington (Note: Shares a grouped parish council with Aldington)
- Boughton Aluph (Note: Shares a grouped parish council with Eastwell)
- Brabourne
- Brook
- Challock
- Charing
- Chilham
- Crundale (Note: Has a parish meeting rather than a parish council due to small population)
- Eastwell (Note: Shares a grouped parish council with Boughton Aluph)
- Egerton
- Godmersham
- Great Chart with Singleton
- Hastingleigh
- High Halden
- Hothfield
- Kenardington
- Kennington
- Kingsnorth
- Little Chart
- Mersham
- Molash
- Newenden
- North Willesborough
- Orlestone
- Pluckley
- Rolvenden
- Ruckinge
- Sevington with Finberry
- Shadoxhurst
- Smarden
- Smeeth
- South Willesborough and Newtown
- Stanhope
- Stone-cum-Ebony
- Tenterden
- Warehorne
- Westwell
- Wittersham
- Woodchurch
- Wye with Hinxhill
