= Vardimon =

Vardimon may refer to:

== People ==
- Jasmin Vardimon (born 1971), Israeli choreographer
- Yarom Vardimon, Israeli designer

== Other uses ==
- Jasmin Vardimon Company, UK based contemporary dance-theatre company
