= Clumping =

Clump or clumping may refer to:

- Clumping (biology), an organic behavior
- Wittenham Clumps, a small group of hills
- Clumped isotopes (chemistry), heavy isotopes that are bonded to other heavy isotopes
- "clump", an iamamiwhoami song
- Transit vehicle clumping, when one public transport vehicle falls behind schedule, and another scheduled behind it meets it in the same location
