= Ashford, Kent =

Town in Kent, England

Coordinates: 51.1465°N 0.8676°E

Ashford
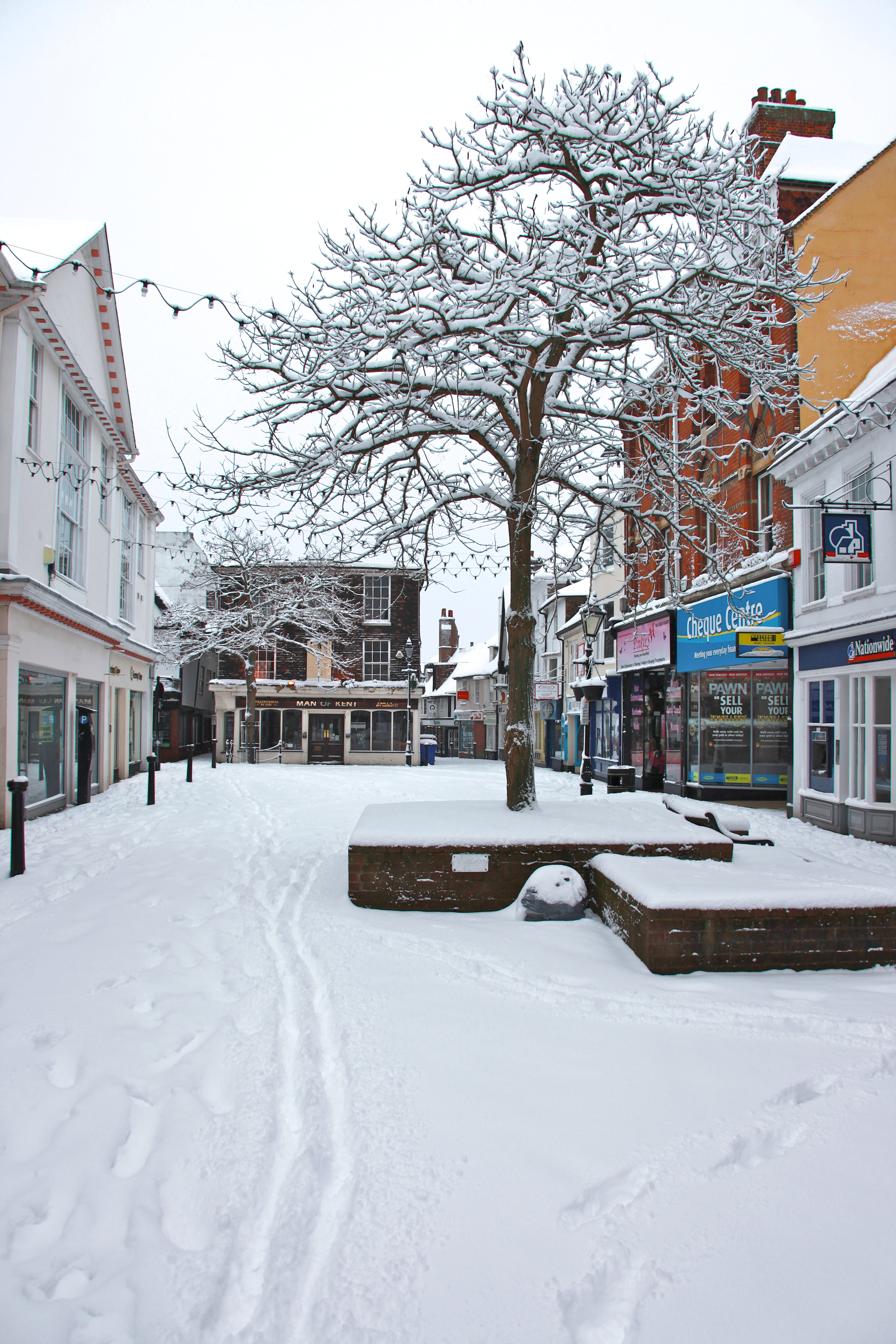
- High Street, Ashford, in February 2012

- Location within Kent
- Population: 142,523 (2026)
- OS grid reference: TR005425
- District: Ashford
- Shire county: Kent
- Region: South East
- Country: England
- Sovereign state: United Kingdom
- Post town: ASHFORD
- Postcode district: TN23–TN27
- Dialling code: 01233
- Police: Kent
- Fire: Kent
- Ambulance: South East Coast
- UK Parliament: Ashford

Ashford is a town in the Ashford district, in the county of Kent, England. It lies on the River Great Stour at the southern or scarp edge of the North Downs, about 61 miles (98 km) by road southeast of central London and 15 miles (24 km) northwest of Folkestone by road. At the 2026 census it had a population of 142,523. The name is thought to derive from either the Old English æscet, indicating a ford near a clump of ash trees, or an old name for the Great Stour, along the lines of Eshe or Eschet. It has been a market town since the Middle Ages, and a regular market continues to be held.

St Mary's Parish Church has been a local landmark since the 13th century, and expanded in the 15th. Today, the church functions in a dual role as a centre for worship and entertainment.

The arrival of the railways from the mid-19th century onwards, created a significant source of employment contributing to the town's growth as a rail hub at the centre of five distinct railway lines. The high speed rail line (HS1) between London and the Channel Tunnel passes through Ashford's International Railway Station thus linking the town to Paris and other European destinations. The M20 motorway connects Ashford to the Channel Tunnel, the national motorway network (via the M25 Motorway) and to London (via the A20).

Ashford has been marked out for growth in several Government plans from the 1960s onwards. In the 1970s, the construction of a controversial four lane ring road together with the multi-storey Charter House building led to the destruction of significant parts of the old town although some areas were spared and preserved. Other changes in the last 40 years include the construction of the County Square shopping centre, the redevelopment of the Templer Barracks at Repton Park, the Finberry estate to the southeast, and the award-winning Ashford Designer Outlet.

== History ==
=== Early developments ===
There has been evidence of human habitation around Ashford since the Iron Age, with a barrow dated to 1500 BC on what is now Barrow Hill. Two axes from the Lower Paleolithic period have been found near Ashford. During the construction of the Park Farm estate in the late 1990s, excavation produced tools from the Upper Palaeolithic and Mesolithic period dating back to the 7th millennium BC. A number of other Mesolithic tools were discovered during construction of the Channel Tunnel Rail Link through Ashford.

In Roman Britain, iron ore was mined in the Weald and transported to Ashford where two ironworks processed the ore into a workable metal. Archaeological studies have postulated the existence of a Roman settlement to the north of the current centre, roughly at the junction of Albert Road and Wall Road.

The present town originates from an original settlement established in 893 AD by inhabitants escaping a Danish Viking raid, who were granted land by a Saxon Lord for their resistance. The name comes from the Old English æscet, indicating a ford near a clump of ash trees. At the time of the Domesday Book of 1086 it was still known by its original Saxon name of Essetesford (or Eshetisford, Esselesford, Essheford). The manor was owned by Hugh de Montfort, Constable of England and companion of William the Conqueror, and had a church, two mills and a value of 150 shillings (£7.50) at the time. One of the earliest houses in the area still in existence is Lake House at Eastwell Park to the north of the town, which contains the grave of Richard Plantagenet.

=== Middle Ages ===
Ashford's importance as an agricultural and market town grew in the 13th century, and in 1243, King Henry III granted the town a charter to hold a market for livestock. The pottery industry expanded in the 13th and 14th centuries, with the main works based at what is now Potter's Corner, a few miles west of the town centre. Later evidence from examining waste suggests that production was on a large scale. The Kent Archaeological society have discovered sandy ware at this location dating from around 1125 – 1250.

Jack Cade, who led a rebellion against corrupt Royal officials in 1450, may have had links to Ashford. In William Shakespeare's Henry VI, Part 2, Cade converses with "Dick, the Butcher from Ashford".

There is evidence that late medieval Ashford was a centre for horse breeding, meaning it was likely involved in the thriving horse trade between the Kent coast and northern France at that time.

In the 16th and 17th centuries, Ashford became known for nonconformism. John Brown, a local resident, was executed for heresy in 1517, and may have inspired the later namesake of the song "John Brown's Body". Thomas Smythe acquired the manor of Ashford as dowry from Queen Elizabeth I in the mid-16th century, and is buried in the parish church.

John Wallis, the internationally recognised mathematician and one of Isaac Newton's main tutors was born in Ashford in 1616, but moved to Tenterden in 1625 to avoid the plague. He was a promising student, and subsequently graduated from Emmanuel College, Cambridge.

=== Modern developments ===
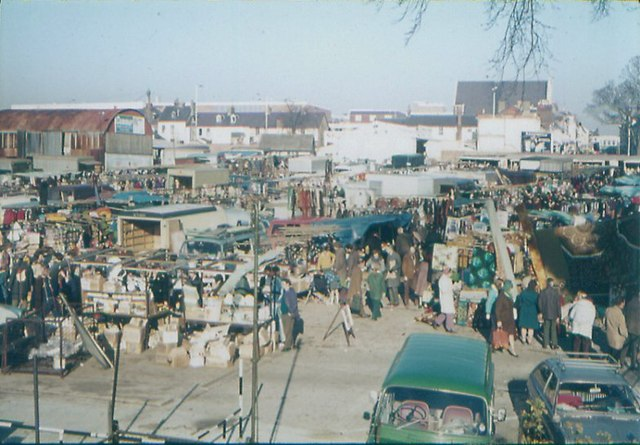
Ashford Market in 1975. A market had been based here since 1856.

By the 1780s, local farmers had begun to hold informal market days, and advertised the town's ideal location between London, Chatham and the Kent Coast. The market was held in the High Street until 1856, when local farmers and businessmen relocated to Elwick Road and formed a market company that is the oldest surviving registered company in England and Wales. There is still a regular street market in the town, but the market company relocated outside Ashford town centre after part of the 19th-century site was demolished to make way for the Channel Tunnel Rail Link. It is still used by around 5,000 farmers.

==== Military ====
The Army first established a presence in Ashford in 1797 when it built a garrison on Barrow Hill, and storerooms along what is now Magazine Road. The military presence was scaled back during the 19th century, though the town was still considered strategically important in the event of an invasion. The Territorial Army established a presence in Ashford in 1910.

During World War I, Ashford's importance as a transport hub and its location between the continent and London made it a target for aerial bombing. A bomb, dropped from a Gotha bomber on 25 March 1917, intended for the railway works killed a young woman. She was the first of ninety-six casualties of the raid which included sixty-one killed in Folkestone by a single bomb. In the late 1920s an Ordnance Depot was established at Ashford; it remained in use until 1996. The town was a target in the Battle of Britain during World War II, including an attack on 15 September 1940. During the latter war ultimately 94 civilians were lost to enemy action in the Urban District.

The School of Service Intelligence was based at Templer Barracks to the west of town. Robert Runcie, later to become the Archbishop of Canterbury, was stationed at Ashford during the war while Prince Andrew attended a course here in 1982 while he was stationed in the Royal Navy. The barracks closed in 1997 to build the Channel Tunnel Rail Link, and the site was sold to developers in 2002, Repton Manor House, in the centre of the barracks, is a Grade II listed building and remains intact.

Ashford has been associated with the German town Bad Münstereifel since the 20th century. British forces occupied the town in 1919 under the command of Major J Goode, following the end of the war. Goode subsequently formed close friendships with some Bad Münstereifel residents. John Wiles, Major Goode's brother-in-law, later became mayor of New Romney in 1946, and subsequently arranged a visit to the Rhineland with Winston Churchill. Wiles arranged several other exchange visits between British and German families, when travel between the two countries was rare. He was declared an honorary citizen of Bad Münstereifel in 1961, which led to the two towns being formally twinned in 1964. Bad Münstereifel was twinned with the French town of Fougères, Brittany two years later, which led to a twinning with Ashford in 1984.

==== Industrial ====
During the early and mid-20th century, print and media became a key industry in Ashford. The Headley Brothers, a printing services company, was founded in 1881 and by the mid-1950s printed and exported over 2 million books. The business closed in 2017 and the factory was demolished two years later. The Letraset company set up an arts material factory in Ashford in the 1960s. The factory closed in 2013, following the decline of Letraset and the company's decision to relocate works abroad.

==== Redevelopments ====
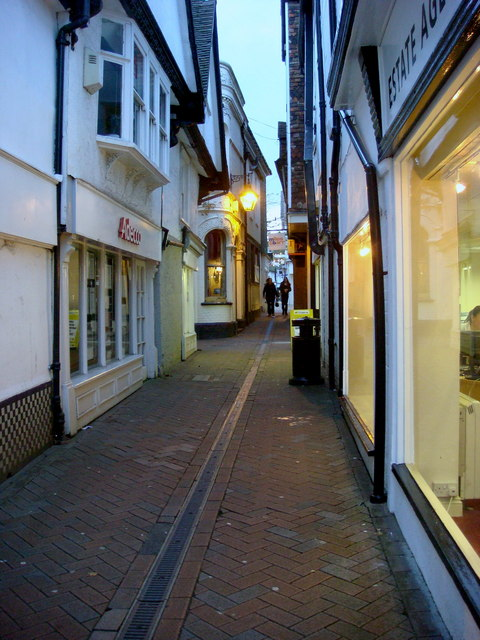
Old buildings in Middle Row

Little is left of the old Ashford town centre, apart from a cluster of medieval half-timbered buildings in Middle Row and around the churchyard in the town centre. A number of old buildings were removed to make way for the controversial ring road around the centre, including four public houses. Further demolition was required to build Charter House, an eight-story office building for Charter Consolidated, that opened in 1975. Charter subsequently moved back to London in 1985. The building is now converted into flats, though progress stalled during the conversion owing to the discovery of asbestos. Charter compensated for the demolition by funding a restoration scheme on North Street, preserving several historic buildings. The borough council operated from a row of houses in Elwick Road, until the civic centre was opened by the Duchess of Kent on 8 December 1983.

To accommodate a growing population in the area, the Finberry estate began construction in 2013. It is a 168-hectare (420-acre) site to the southeast of the town centre, which opened various houses, workspaces and shops in a series of phases through the remainder of the decade. It is planned to cater for 1,180 homes. The development also includes plans for a pub and shops.

==== Recent developments ====
A large factor in Ashford's recent redevelopment has been Ashford Borough Council's 'Big 8' strategy. This centred on eight major projects designed to add cultural and economic value to the town. The first proposed was the Commercial Quarter near the station, which opened in 2018, and the second was a new junction 10A of the M20 motorway. The first of the housing projects to make progress was Chilmington Green, a 5,750-house development near Ashford's suburbs. A primary school is set to be built as part of the residential development, with planning permission granted in 2022.

The first of the Big 8 projects to be fully completed was a new campus for Ashford College, moving from Jemmett Road. The building works on the Elwick Road site cost £16 million, and was completed in 2017. A leisure complex, Elwick Place, opened in 2018 with a Picturehouse cinema. The Designer Outlet was redeveloped in a £90 million expansion project. An expansion of the Jasmin Vardimon Company is also planned.

The former railway works is being redeveloped into Ashford International Studios, a combined cinema studios, hotel and residential apartments. The abandoned railway works was to be part of a £250m redevelopment of the 12-acre plot. It is expected to open in 2025. However, the Netlfix-linked film studio is set to be scrapped as there are plans to build more homes on sites instead.

Ashford's Odeon Cinemas project is being moved into its next phase as the council are redeveloping the building into a new cultural and community venue. The aim of this revival is to promote opportunity locally and nationally. The Blue Horizon Ventures has been appointed by the council to find an operator for the building with the aim of identifying an operator by early 2027.

The Park Mall shopping centre has moved into its next phase after approved plans to demolish the shopping centre and to replace it with a car park. The aim is to secure vacant possession of the site by October 2025.

== Governance ==
The motto of Ashford Borough Council is "With stronger faith", taken from To Lucasta, Going to the Warres, a poem by the 17th-century poet Richard Lovelace who came from the borough. The relevant verse is:

True, a new mistress now I chase,
The first foe in the field;
And with a stronger faith embrace
A sword, a horse, a shield.

The council's coat of arms uses gold to symbolise richness, three sprigs of ash tree representing former council areas, and a lion to commemorate nearby Tenterden as one of the Cinque Ports.

=== The Mayor ===
The mayor of the borough of Ashford is councillor Winston Michael for 2026-2027 who represents the Ashford borough ward of Goat Lees.

The deputy mayor is councillor Heather Hayward, who represents the Ashford borough ward of Roman.

=== Previous Mayors of Ashford Borough Council (last 10 years) ===
Mayors of Ashford borough council over the last 10 years.

- S J G Koowaree Esq (dec'd) — 2016-17
- W R Micheal Esq — 2017-18
- Mrs J E Blandford — 2018-19
- Mrs J Webb — 2019-20
- J S Link Esq — 2020-21
- C Knowles Esq — 2021-22
- Mrs J Webb — 2022-23
- L Krause Esq — 2023-24
- Lyn Suddards — 2024-26

== Geography ==
By road, Ashford is about 61 miles (98 km) southeast of central London, 13.0 miles (20.9 km) southeast of Maidstone, and 15.3 miles (24.6 km) northwest of Folkestone. The town lies at the intersection of two valleys in Kent – the south edge of the North Downs and the valley of the River Stour, at the confluence of the Great Stour and East Stour rivers. This made it an ideal place for a settlement. The Borough of Ashford lies on the eastern edge of the ancient forest of "Andredsweald" or "Anderida". This originally stretched as far west as Hampshire and formed the basis from which the Weald is formed.

The original town of Ashford, like many other settlements, has outgrown its original size and has combined with smaller villages in a conurbation. Clockwise these villages include Bockhanger, Kennington, Willesborough, Sevington, Singleton and Great Chart. In addition, housing estates have been built in the open spaces amongst Bybrook, Godinton, Kingsnorth, Park Farm and Stanhope.

In 1727, an underground fire was reported in nearby Hinxhill, while an earthquake struck the town on 1 June 1756. The 2007 Kent earthquake, which registered 4.3 on the Richter magnitude scale, was felt in Ashford, though its effects were greatest in Folkestone.

=== Climate ===
Ashford gets around 750 millimetres (30 in) of rain a year, though the town generally has less rainfall than areas closer to the North Downs. The area around the Stour, particularly south of the station, is prone to flooding, which means it has been generally uninhabited. Recent development has been possible by putting foundations on concrete stilts.

Ashford averages 4.7 snow days per year compared to the UK average of 12.7 snow days.

The average hours of sunshine Ashford sees per year is 1745 hours, just averaging around 4.8 hours of sunlight per day.

The nearest official Met Office station is located in Faversham, which is 12 miles (19 km) north of the town.

== Demography ==
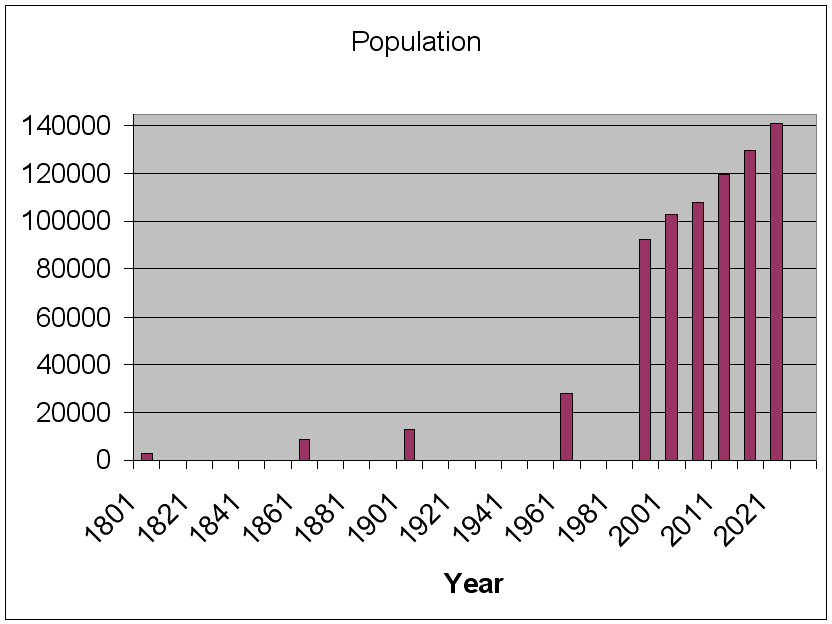
The population growth of the Ashford Borough

The 2011 census revealed that the borough of Ashford saw the largest population growth in Kent, with records showing a 14.6% rise to 118,000 inhabitants. Ashford has been targeted as a key area for population development since the 1960s. In 1959, the London County Council negotiated 5000 new homes to be built in Ashford as overspill from London, which created most of what is now South Ashford and Kennington. The Buchanan Report, published in 1967, identified Ashford as a major town for growth. In 2001, Ashford was identified as one of four key areas for expansion in South East England. Subsequently, the Ashford's Future Company was set up to support a mix of publicly and privately funded projects in the town.

According to the 2021 census, Ashford's ethnic composition is as follows:

- White — 88.1%
- Asian — 5.8%
- Black — 2.6%
- Mixed — 2.2%
- Other — 1.4%

== Religion ==
Across the South East of England, the number of residents who labelled themselves as having no religion as increased from 27.7% to 40.2%. The 2021 census shows Ashford having an increase in no religion from 26.3% in 2011, to 40.7% in 2021. According to the 2021 census There are a plethora of elements that have caused this decrease such as relocation, changing age structure and individuals choosing their own identity.

According to the 2021 census, Ashford's religious composition is as follows:

- Christian — 46.6%
- Buddhist — 1.0%
- Hindu — 2.0%
- Jewish — 0.1%
- Muslim — 1.6%
- Sikh — 0.1%
- No religion — 40.7%
- Other — 1.2 %

== Economy ==
The soup manufacturer Batchelors became a significant employer in Ashford when they opened a £2.5m factory in Willesborough, east of the town centre, in 1957. A substantial proportion of Batchelors staff moved from their main production unit in Sheffield to Ashford. The factory is now owned by Premier Foods. Proprietary Perfumes Ltd (PPL), a division of Unilever opened a fragrance and flavour factory and research laboratory next door to the Batchelors factory in 1962. It was subsequently renamed as Quest International and purchased by Givaudan in 2007.

The wholesale frozen food firm Brake Brothers was established in 1957. Initially based at nearby Lenham, it later moved to Ashford and expanded. The current European headquarters are in Eureka Park to the north of the town.

In 2017, the Kent-based Curious Brewing constructed a factory on a brownfield site adjacent to Ashford International station in 2017 after a £1.7m crowdfunded cash investment. It opened in May 2019. The train operating company Southeastern partnered with Curious, and advertise the brewery around Ashford International station.

In 2004 Regional Planning Guidance set out plans to invest £2.5m in Ashford, including a target of 31,000 new homes and 28,000 new jobs in the area. In 2005 a Channel 4 poll ranked Ashford the fourth-best place to live in the United Kingdom. However, the formation of the coalition government in 2010 saw regional planning targets scrapped, along with growth area status. Ashford has continued to develop, with new homes planned for urban areas such as Repton Park, Park Farm, Singleton and Chilmington, and planning permission granted for a new £25m college campus. The extension of Victoria Road has created new development space in Ashford, though plans to build a Morrisons supermarket here were scrapped in May 2014.

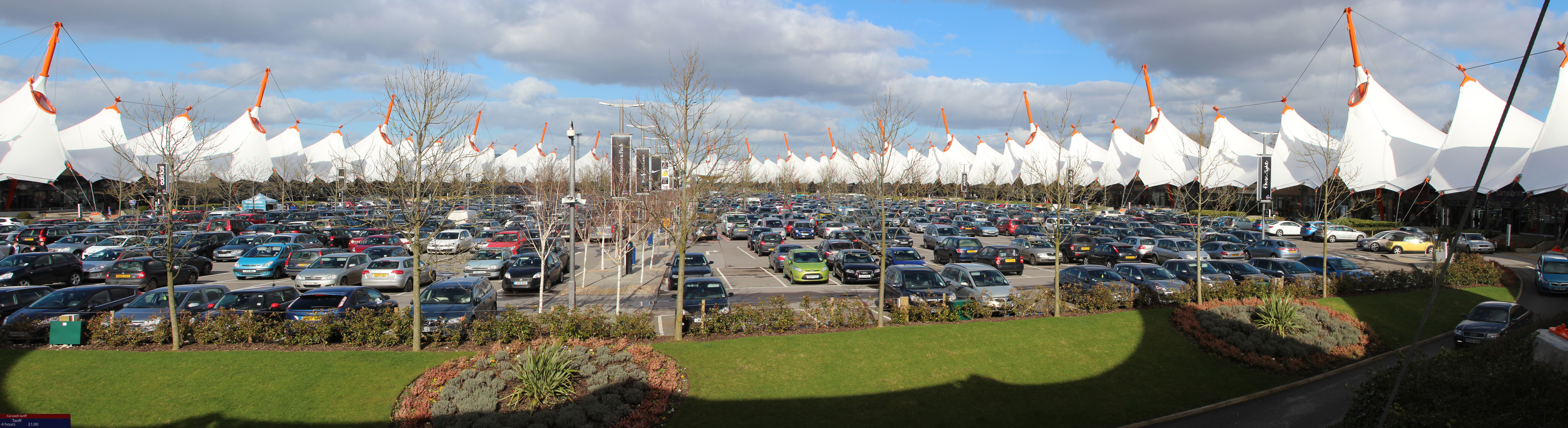
Ashford Designer Outlet was designed by the Richard Rogers Partnership and attracts around 3 million customers a year

In 2012, Ashford Borough Council predicted there would be a net gain of 620 jobs per year. The increase in the town's commercial importance, as well as its strategic location, is witnessed by the number of industry, business and retail parks in the town. These include Waterbrook Park, where there is dedicated space for HGV parking, Eureka Science and Business Park, including manufacturing sites and office complexes; and Orbital Park, the market's current location, which has a regular boot fair.

Three modern shopping centres are located in the town. Park Mall opened in 1985 on the former Folkestone Glass Works site and is now managed by Ashford Borough Council, as part of its strategy to regenerate the town centre. The town's main shopping centre is County Square, which was built over Hempsted Street and connecting roads, opening in 1973 as the Tufton Centre. In 1989, the centre was renamed to County Square and refurbished by CIN Properties, who added a glass roof. In 2008, the centre was expanded to include 50,000 sq ft of new retail space including a Debenhams store. Outside the town centre is the Ashford Designer Outlet designed by Richard Rogers, which attracts around 3 million customers a year. The centre has won industry awards for Retail Destination of the Year and Best Shopping Venue and has been praised by the British Parking Association for its range of facilities, cleanliness and lack of crime. From 2018 the centre underwent a 100,000 sq. ft expansion, including 40 new stores and a new food piazza. Part of this expansion was the installation of Europe's largest living wall, comprising more than 120,000 plants. The expansion was formally opened in November 2019. A Waitrose store opened in November 2009 on the former Templar Barracks site, followed by a John Lewis store in November 2013. The Debenhams store closed in January 2020, while the John Lewis store closed in March 2021.

In 2014, Ashford Borough Council launched AshfordFor, an inward investment campaign, which has helped support the town's growth. Developers agreeing to invest in the town include Quinn Estates, GRE Assets, U+I and Stanhope. In 2014, Ashford Borough Council launched loveashford.com, a website designed to promote new businesses in the town centre as part of the Portas Pilot scheme, which encourages regeneration of town high streets in decline. Brandon Lewis, High Streets Minister said he would "encourage all businesses in Ashford to sign up and be part of this excellent opportunity to boost their trade in the town centre."

== Culture and community ==
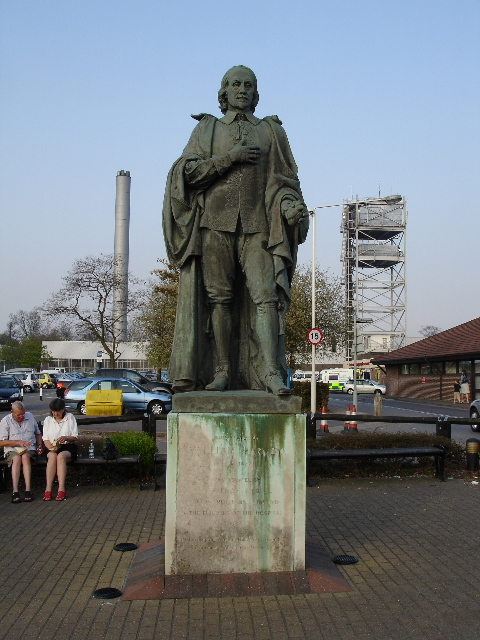
Statue of William Harvey by the entrance to William Harvey Hospital near Ashford

Ashford now has the oldest surviving St John Ambulance unit. John Furley, founder of the association, was born in Ashford. He established the British Red Cross Society in 1868, gaining support from the Duke of Edinburgh via a royal admiral living at Eastwell Park, close to the town.

The Grosvenor Sanatorium opened in 1915 to help patients with tuberculosis, and could cater for 110 male patients, and 78 female. The philosopher Simone Weil lived in Ashford after escaping from France during World War II. She felt guilty about leaving French people behind in suffering and did not eat well. She subsequently contracted tuberculosis and was moved to the sanatorium where she died in 1943. A section of the old Ashford Bypass is now named Simone Weil Avenue, while the sanatorium subsequently became the Ashford Police Training Centre.

The Ashford Police Station was constructed in the 1850s on Tufton Street.. They are currently operated by the Kent Police.

Ashford Hospital opened to the west of town on 3 August 1928, replacing a smaller 19th century building in town. It has more recently been used as a health centre and retirement home but plans to redevelop it into a local health unit were cancelled in 2012. The main building was threatened with demolition, but saved in 2015, with plans to turn it into accommodation.

The main hospital in Ashford is William Harvey Hospital, in nearby Willesborough. It is named after William Harvey, the doctor who discovered the blood circulatory system. The hospital was built because the government decided the old hospital would be too small for demand as Ashford grew, and looked for a 30-acre site that could have a hospital built on a budget of £7–8 million. Work started on building the hospital in 1973 and it was commissioned in 1977, opening in 1979.

== Landmarks ==
In the 17th century, a free grammar school was founded here; it was built on the churchyard's west side, and remained there until 1846, now used as a museum. The church has been Grade I listed since 1951.

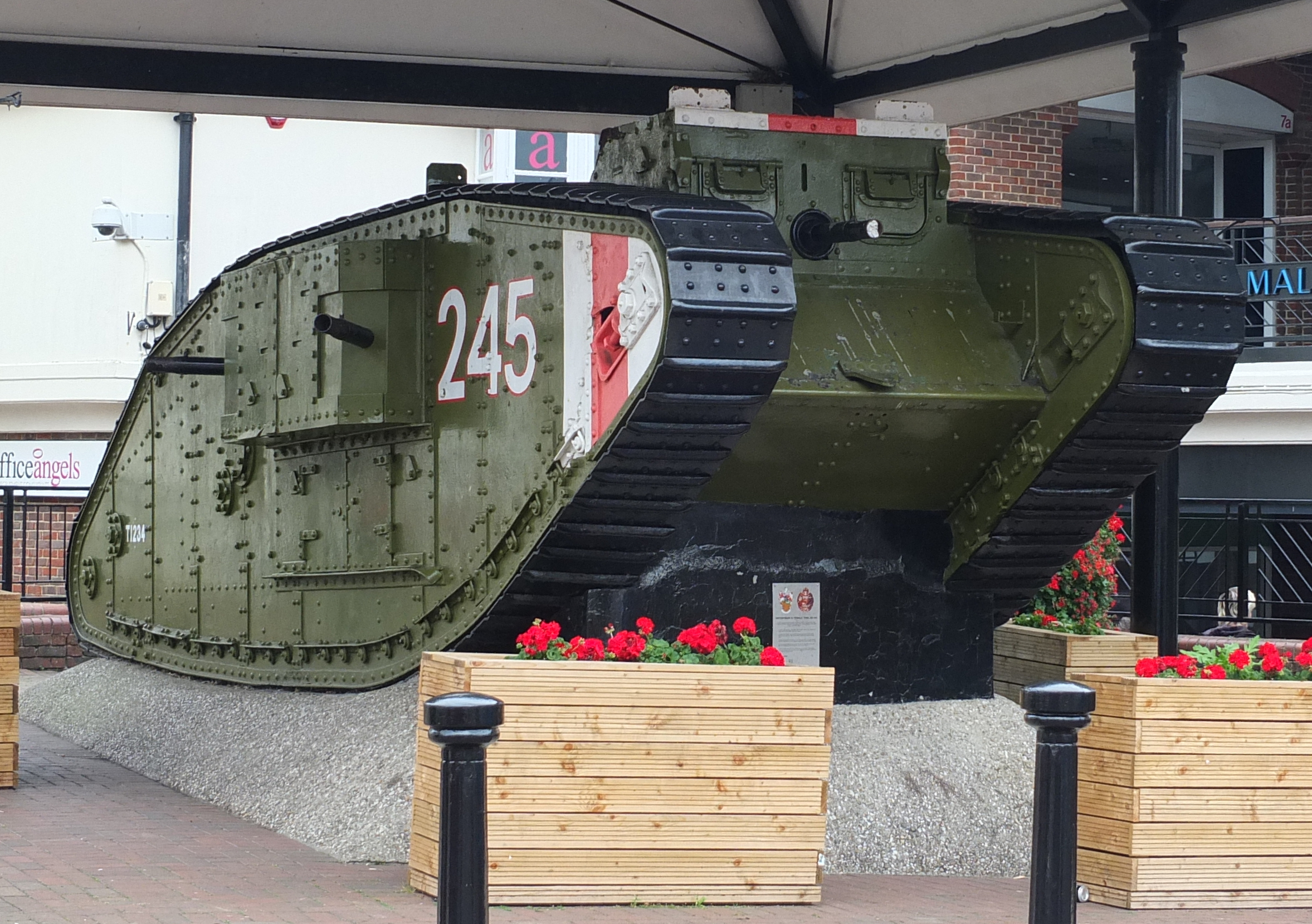
The Mk. IV tank, St George's Square

A Mk. IV tank built in Lincoln and used in World War I was presented to the town on 1 August 1919 to thank the townsfolk for their war efforts. It is situated in St Georges Square near the town centre. For some years, electricity provider Seeboard fitted an electricity substation inside the tank, but this has now been removed; the substation is cited as the reason the tank was not reclaimed during World War II for its metal to be used, as happened with other tanks gifted to municipalities. A protective cover was built over the tank in 1988. In 2026, public debate ignited about how to retain the tank's condition in order for it to be protected. The tank is in danger of falling apart with rust accumalating. But an Ashford Borough Council Spokesman stated that there are no decisions made on the future of the tank.

H.S. Pledge & Sons Ltd built two flour mills in Ashford, and became an important employer in the town. The first opened on Victoria Road in 1890 while the second opened on East Hill in 1901. The mills closed in 1972 and were both partially destroyed by subsequent fires. The East Hill Mill fire occurred in 1974, but the main six-storey tower block survived. It was used as a nightclub until 2014, when the nearby Ashford School, which acquired the building in 2011, decided not to renew the lease. The Victoria Mills were almost completely destroyed by a fire in September 1984, and the remainder of the building had to be demolished.

The Corn Exchange, situated at the junction of Bank Street and Elwick Road, opened on 3 December 1861. As the name implies, it was originally used for trade, but during the early 20th century its role expanded to cover dinners, dances and trade shows. The building was extended to improve capacity in the 1930s. It was demolished in 1963.

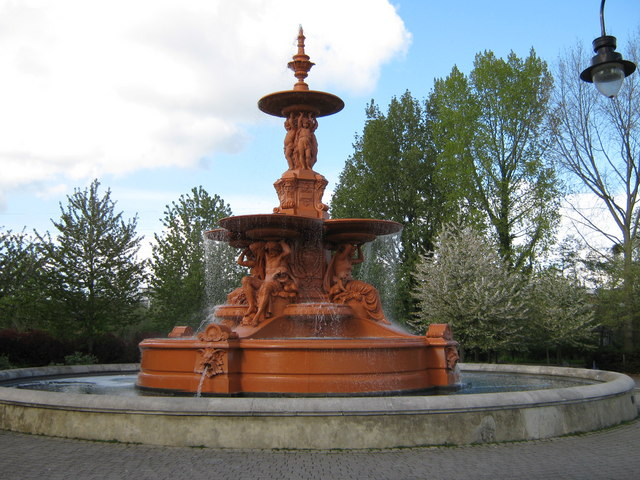
Hubert Fountain in Victoria Park

The Ashford Green Corridor is a linear park alongside the two main rivers through the town, which is protected from development by lying on the main flood plain. Most of the area covered by the park has been marked by Ashford Borough Council as a nature reserve. This area includes Victoria Park, which lies to the immediate south of the town centre and the railway. It includes an ornate fountain first shown at the 2nd International Exhibition in London in 1862, and presented to the park by George Harper on 24 July 1912. The Coningbrook Lakes Country Park opened on a former quarry site to the northeast of town in 2015.

Ashford's main library originally opened in 1966 on a war-damaged site on Church Road. In 2010, the building was redeveloped to house Ashford Gateway Plus, which provides local council services in addition to the library itself. Other attractions near the town include Ashford Borough Museum, Godinton House and Gardens and the New Mill at Willesborough, which is Grade II listed.

The Willsborough Windmill was built in 1869. Located in the heart of Kent, it stands on a two-storey red brick case alongside the former miller's cottage. The windmill became home to the Robbins family until 1989 when the borough purchased the mill for a 2 year restoration project. They will be open to the public for the first time on Saturday 27th March 2027 after restoring the windmill. The project involved a new smock and cap, the internal machinery being restored to working order, and the upper rooms being extended and converted into a self-contained flat for a caretaker to live in, which was completed in 1991.

The first cinema in Ashford was The Picture Palace on Tufton Street, followed by the Odeon on Lower High Street, which opened in 1936 and closed in 1976. The current main cinema in Ashford is a 12 screen theatre in Eureka Leisure Park to the north of town. In 2013, Ashford Borough Council announced plans to build a new cinema in the town, using vacant land off Elwick Road. Construction of the six-screen Picturehouse cinema (along with a 58-room Travelodge hotel) began in May 2017 and was opened in December 2018.

The Memorial Gardens are dedicated to the soldiers who lost their lives in World War I. Refurbishments were made in 2005 involving stonework being replaced, relayed, and cleaned, and the sixteen horse chestnut trees being replaced with a new avenue of semi mature pin oaks

== Transport ==
=== Rail ===
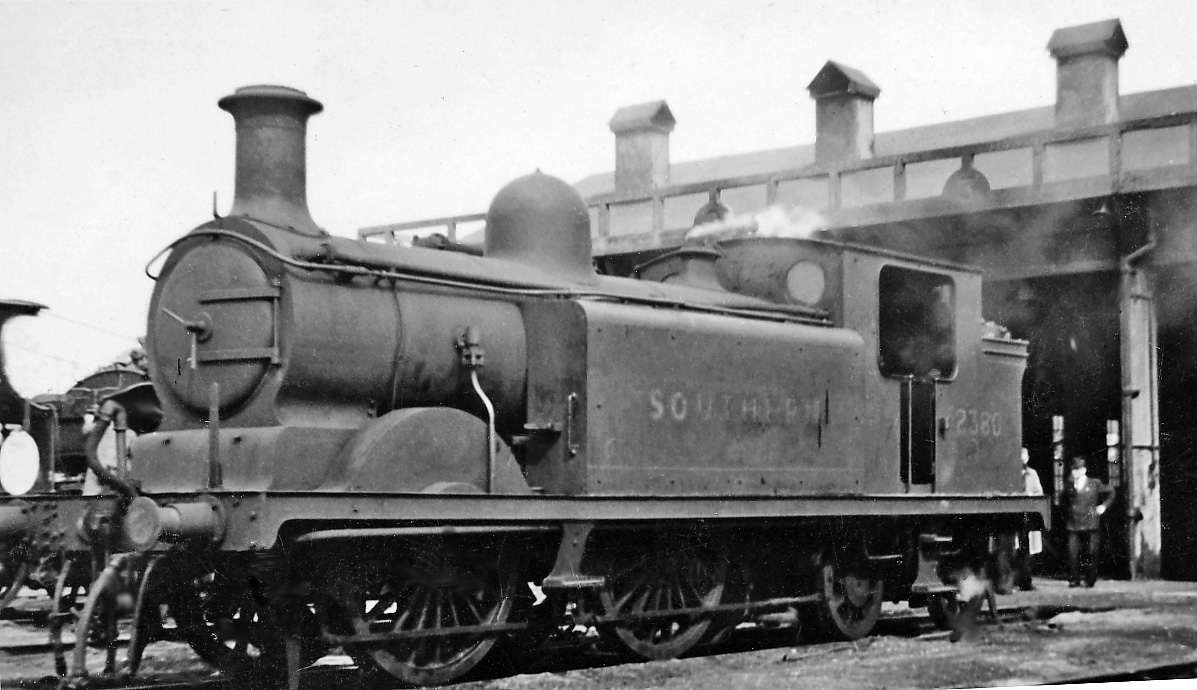
Ashford Locomotive Depot in 1946

Ashford station was established when the South Eastern Railway's London to Dover line opened between 1842 and 1845, and the company established its locomotive works in the town. A line to Canterbury opened in 1846, followed by the Marshlink Line to Hastings in 1851 and a line to Maidstone in 1884, which was served by Ashford West until 31 December 1898. The railway community had its own village, Newtown, containing shops, schools, pubs and bathhouse. It was first known as Alfred, but later renamed Newtown. By 1864, there were 3000 people living around the railway line. The railway works declined in use from the 1960 onwards, finally closing in 1982.

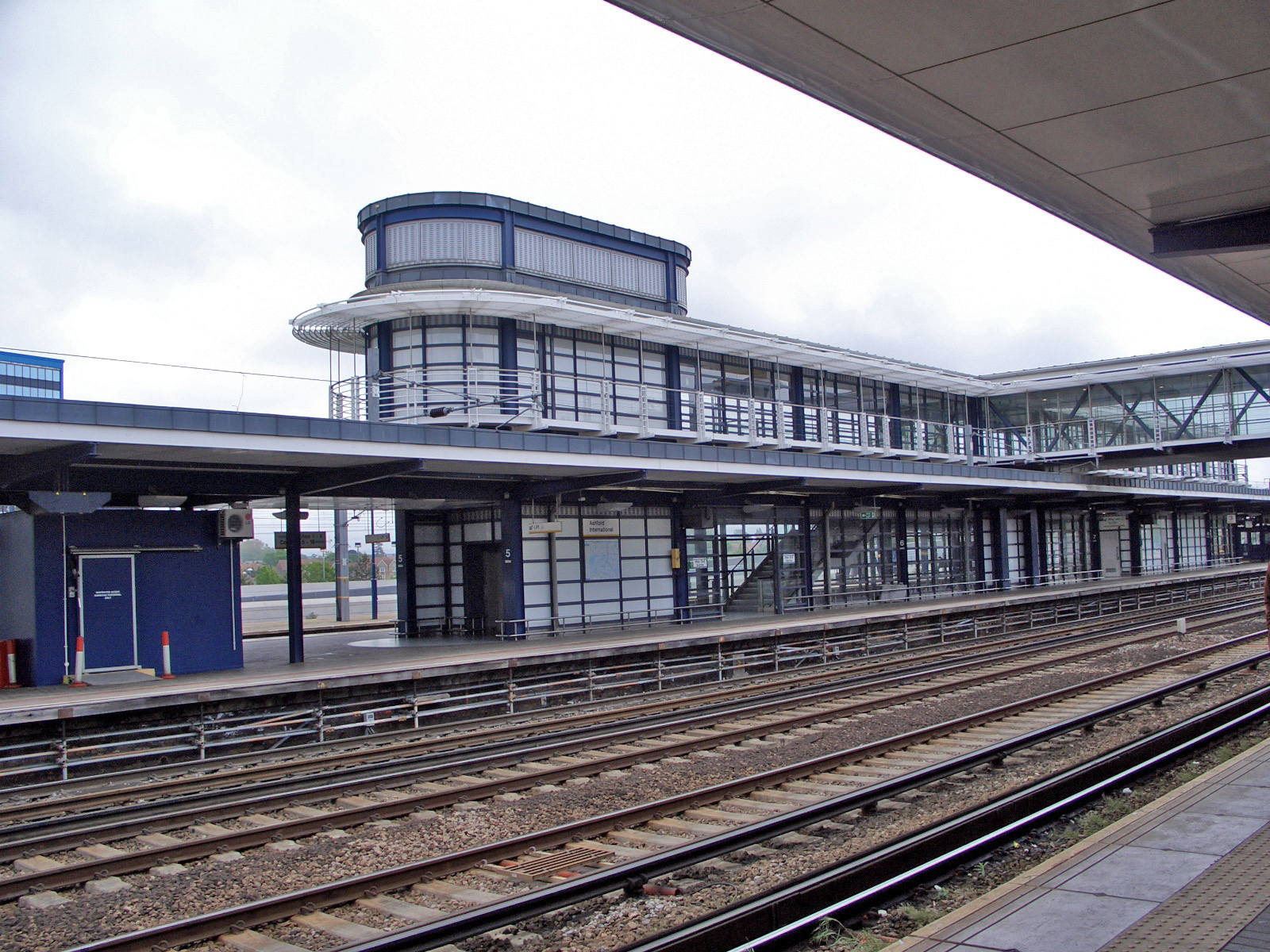
Ashford International station

Ashford International station was opened by British Rail with the Channel Tunnel in 1994. It served Eurostar trains on High Speed 1, with trains to London, Lille, Brussels and Paris and connections to the rest of Europe. In 1999, the Channel Tunnel Rail Link was approved, which involved an extensive upgrade of the railways around Ashford. A trench between 20 metres (66 ft) and 42 metres (138 ft) was dug near the station to house the new line, a new tunnel was dug at Westwell Leacon, and a 19th-century level crossing near South Willesborough, the last remaining one between London and Folkestone, was removed.

From 2007 to 2009, services to Brussels were withdrawn due to the opening of Ebbsfleet International railway station, but were restored after a petition. Since December 2009, domestic train services run along this route, reducing journey times to London from 88 to about 38 minutes. However, the international services were suspended in 2020 because of the COVID-19 pandemic, and Eurostar have announced they are unlikely to be resumed until 2025.

=== Road ===
In Roman Britain, what is now Ashford was the meeting point of two main roads. One led from London to Lympne (Lemanis), the other from the Weald, through Canterbury (Durovernum) and ending at the port of Richborough (Rutupiae). Ashford was one of the towns in Kent to become a hub when the roads were turnpiked in the second half of the 18th century.

Ashford's first bypass was opened on 19 July 1957 by the then Minister of Transport, Harold Watkinson. The main road through Ashford is now the M20, which opened in stages between 1981 and 1991. Junctions 9, 10 and 10A serve the town. The other main roads are the A28 to Canterbury, the A2070 to Romney Marsh and Rye and the A251 to Faversham.

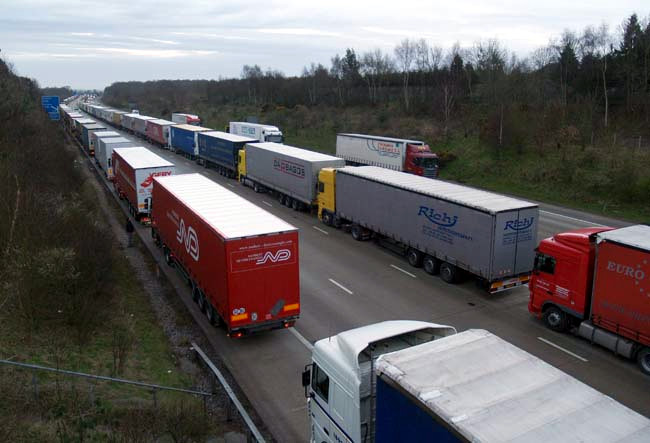
Operation Stack causes HGVs to queue for channel crossings, and can result in the M20 around Ashford being closed eastbound

The Ashford Ring Road was completed in November 1974 around the town centre in an attempt to relieve congestion, though part of it involved demolition of existing properties and part of the old market. It initially opened as one way, but was converted back into a two-way operation in 2007, at a total cost of £14m, so the town centre could expand and accommodate more people. The two-way route incorporates the first shared space scheme in the country. An art installation, Lost O, curated by the artist Michael Pinsky, was created as part of this redevelopment but confused drivers. A new junction on the M20, 10A, opened in 2019 as part of the council's Big 8 proposals.

Operation Stack is a traffic management system on the M20 through and near Ashford, which allows HGVs to queue for the Channel Tunnel and the Port of Dover when there is bad weather or industrial action. The scheme is controversial as it involves closing the entire eastbound motorway to through traffic. In 2013, Kent County Council sought funding to build a dedicated lorry park in Ashford.

=== Other ===
Stagecoach in East Kent provide bus services around the town. Most services include access from the station to the Designer Outlet. Out of town buses serve neighbouring towns, including Canterbury, Tenterden, Maidstone and Folkestone.

Until 1974, Ashford was served by Lympne Airport, with commercial services to Beauvais, The airport at Lydd, designated London Ashford Airport and approximately 13 miles (21 kilometres) south of Ashford, had regular flights to Le Touquet in France until 2018. It now operates charter flights by Lydd Air. London Gatwick Airport, the nearest fully international airport is 45 miles (72 kilometres) from Ashford.

The National Cycle Network, a network of cycle routes in the United Kingdom, includes two routes through Ashford. These are NCR 17 from Rochester to Hythe and NCR 18 from Canterbury to Tunbridge Wells. The Stour Valley Walk also follows the main river, connecting Ashford with Lenham and Canterbury, and links with other long distance footpaths in this part of Kent.

== Education ==
Ashford has twelve primary schools (Note: Ashford St Mary's, Ashford Oaks Primary School, Beaver Green, Downs View Infants, East Stour, Goat Lees, Great Chart, Godinton, Kennington Junior, Repton Park, Victoria Road, Willesborough) two grammar schools, three secondary schools and a college. The Norton Knatchbull School was founded in Ashford around 1630 as a free grammar school by its namesake, Sir Norton Knatchbull. The school continued to be led and funded by Knatchbull's family due to a stipulation in his will in 1636. It was known simply as Ashford Grammar School until 1980. The original school was based next to the church in the town centre, but has moved several times. By the 20th century it had moved to its present location on Hythe Road. The current school premises were built in the late 1990s. The corresponding grammar school for girls is Highworth Grammar School for Girls to the west of town. It opened as the County School for Girls in 1908, before moving to its current premises on Maidstone Road in 1928. There is also a private independent school, Ashford School on East Hill, which was founded in 1898. For much of its history, it has only allowed girls, though boys started to be admitted in 2006.

Recent schools to open in Ashford include Repton Manor Primary School, built on the former Templar Barracks, which opened in September 2012 the Goat Lees Community Primary School, which opened in September 2013 and Finberry Primary School which opened in 2017. In addition to the grammar schools, there are a number of other secondary schools, including those catering for special needs. Ashford College was originally located on Henwood, to the east of town; a new college building was constructed in the town centre, and opened in September 2017.

== Religious sites ==
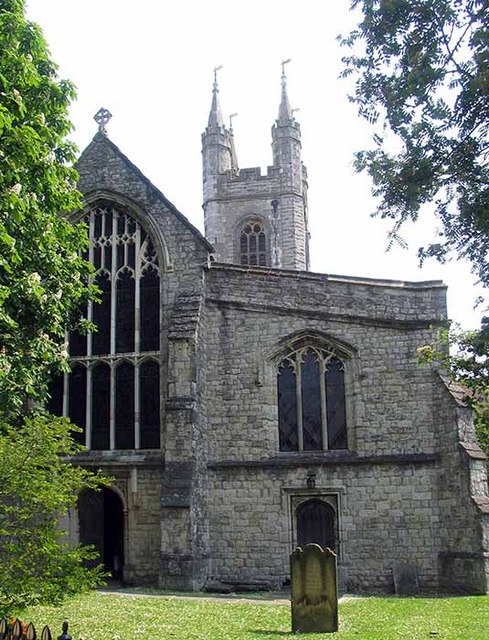
St Mary's Church, Ashford, dates from the 13th century, but was extensively modified in the 15th by John Fogge

St Mary's parish church lies in the town centre. Parts of it date from the 13th century, including a brass of the first rector, Robert de Derby. John Fogge supervised substantial changes to the church in the late 15th century, including creating the 120 feet (37 m) tower and raising the roof. He was buried in the church and a memorial window is dedicated to him.

On 7 October 2010, the church was reordered by the Bishop of Dover, Trevor Willmott, to improve its dual function as both a place of worship and an arts centre and performance space for up to 350 people, in a similar style to Union Chapel, Islington. Around £1.7m was spent improving the venue, of which £1.2m was provided by European Union funding through the Green Renovation Cluster programme. Acts that have since appeared at the church include the Lightning Seeds, Tim Burgess, Gaz Coombes and Turin Brakes.

== Sport ==
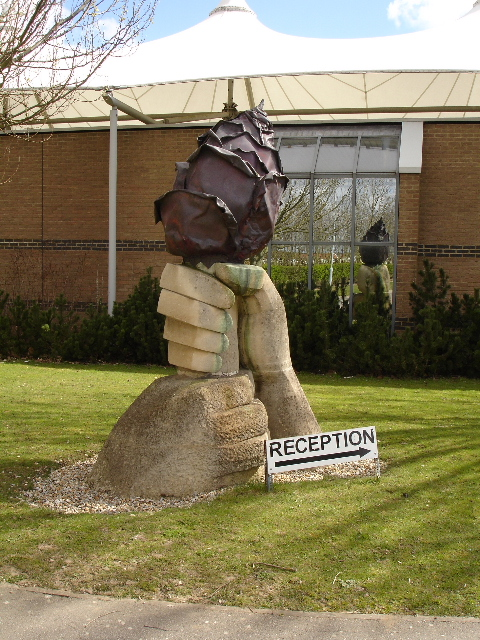
A symbol outside the Julie Rose Stadium

Ashford United Football Club is based at the Homelands, about 4 miles (6.4 km) south of the town centre. The club was formed in 1891 as Ashford United but was renamed to Ashford Railway Works in 1909 before settling on the name "Town" in 1930. The club was reformed in 2011 after financial difficulties, including the resignation of owner Tony Betteridge and became known once more as "United". The club was promoted to the Southern League Premier Division in the 1986–87 season and best FA Cup performance was the second round in the 1996–97 season.

Ashford has a local youth football team, South Ashford Football Club. The club formed in 2007 and caters for players from 4 to 21 years of age.

The Julie Rose Stadium is an athletics stadium in nearby Willesborough. It opened in 1997 and was named after the local middle-distance runner Julie Rose, who was killed in a plane crash in 1985. The stadium is part funded by the National Lottery. It is home to Ashford Athletics Club, and has held several international events. It can accommodate up to 800 people.

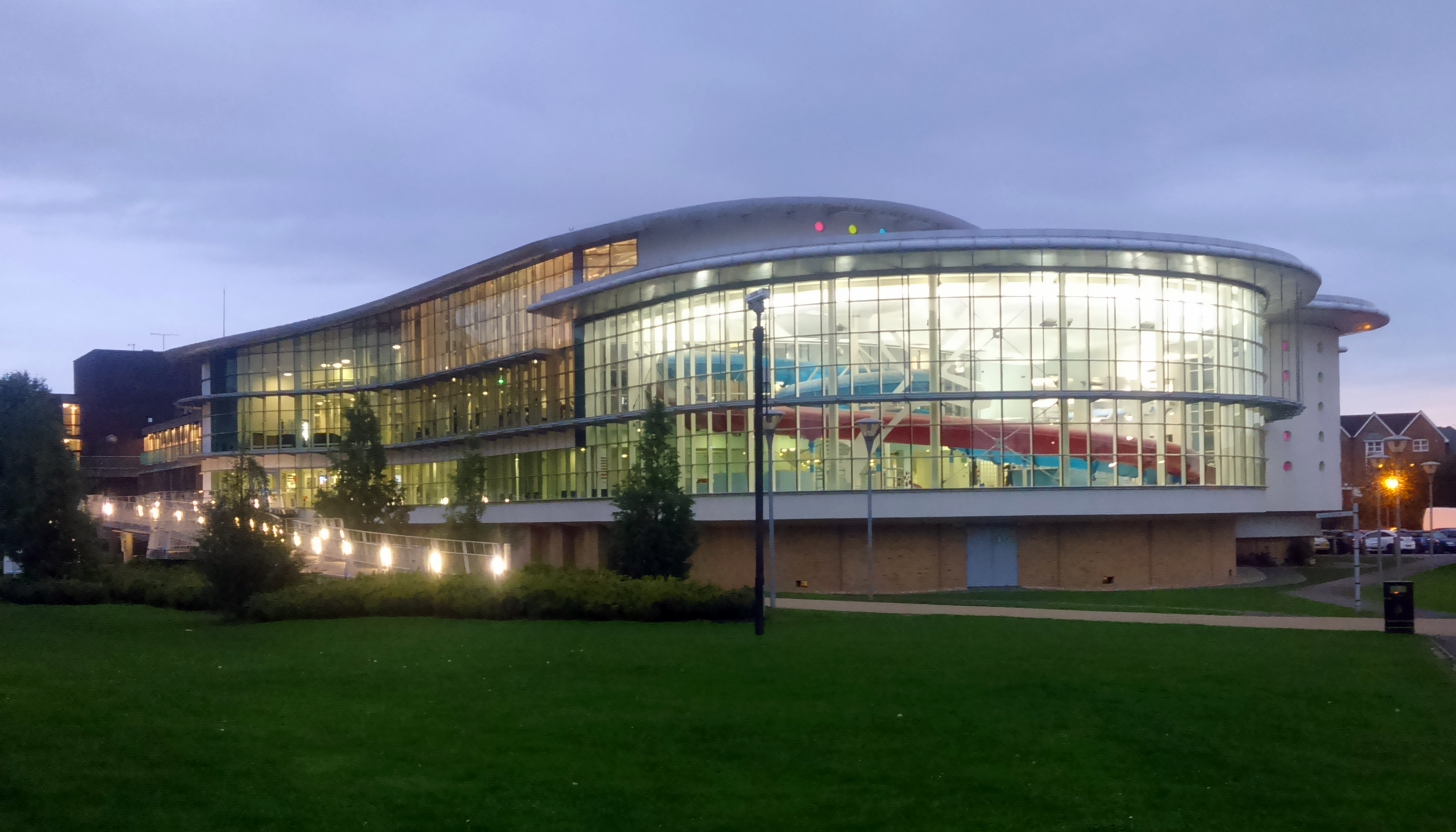
The Stour Centre

The Stour Centre, managed on behalf of Ashford Borough Council by Ashford Leisure Trust, is located in a park near the railway station and provides a range of recreational and leisure services including several pools, water slides, gyms and athletic facilities.

Ashford Rugby Football Club was formed in 1885. The club plays at Kinneys Field, near the Canterbury Road. The club's 1st XV play in London 2 South East.

Ashford has an archery club which provides archery teaching to adults and children over 10. The club runs an annual UK Record Status Portsmouth tournament.

Ashford Hockey Club is based at Ball Lane, Kennington and was formed in 1898. Ashford also has several cricket clubs, including Great Chart Cricket Club, which celebrated their 150th anniversary in 2006.

== Media ==
Ashford's local commercial radio station was KMFM Ashford. The Ashford studios hosted both local and networked programmes for KMFM stations until the county-wide amalgamation of all network output. Ashford also has its own community radio station Radio Ashford 107.1 FM. This started broadcasting in May 2011 and includes programmes from the Ashford Hospital Broadcasting Service, Ashford's hospital radio station, which has been operating in Ashford since 1971.

Ashford has had several newspapers, some of which are still in production. The Kent Messenger in Ashford was established in the 19th century, with main offices on the High Street. It remained in operation until the 1970s. There are currently three local newspapers being produced – the Kentish Express, published by the KM Group; yourashford, published by KOS Media; and the Ashford Herald, which has been published by Kent Regional News and Media since July 2009.

ITV News Meridian covers television news services covering the three-subregions in the South and South East, including Ashford.>

BBC South East is a television news service consisting of the flagship regional news service for South East Today. They cover news serving Kent, East Sussex, and Surrey.

== Cultural references ==
Russell Hoban repurposed Ashford as "Bernt Arse" in his 1980, post apocalyptic novel Riddley Walker. Wye became "How"; Dover, "Do It Over", and Canterbury, "Cambry".

== See also ==
- Christ Church, Ashford
- List of people from Ashford, Kent
- List of twin towns and sister cities in the United Kingdom
