= Ashford International Studios =

Proposed project in Newtown, Kent, England

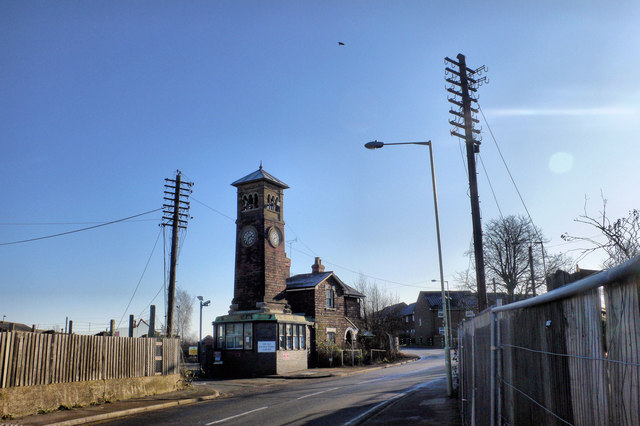
Proposed entrance to the site in Newtown

Ashford International Studios was a proposed multi-media commercial and residential site in Newtown, a suburb of Ashford, Kent, in England, on the site of the former Ashford railway works, adjacent to Ashford International station.

== History ==
The project was created after the site of the railway works had lain dormant for over 30 years, and following a report by the British Film Institute that the film industry requires 10,000 further employees in the next five years, along with around two million square feet (190,000 m^{2}) of additional space. The town council has said that although on-location filming is popular in Kent, citing films such as Avengers: Age of Ultron and Into The Woods, there are no appropriate local production facilities.

The site covers 500,000 square feet (46,000 m^{2}) and includes five Grade II listed buildings, and is a joint scheme between Ashford Borough Council and the privately funded Quinn Estates. Plans were first approved by the council in April 2020. The existing listed buildings on site, including the railway sheds, will be developed around and incorporated into the final design. As of June 2022, the site is 65% funded by the council. Facilities include a hotel, 300 apartments, a restaurant and a multi-story car park. Netflix, Amazon and HBO have all expressed interest in operating on the site. The project has been approved by local Member of Parliament Damian Green.

The studios were originally planned to open in 2022, but progress was delayed because of the COVID-19 pandemic. In 2021, Quinn Estates hoped work could be completed by 2023. The project was boosted in October 2022 by a £14.7 million boost from the government's Levelling Up Fund. In March 2023, the council agreed to a £50m loan to secure funding for development. Around £400,000 has been funded for improvements in road access to the site, including the nearby A2070 road. Preliminary enabling and infrastructure works began to take place in 2023.

Full construction was expected to begin that August, and the studios to open in July 2025. However, in September 2024, the company running the scheme said it had failed to find an operator, with the four candidates saying there was no "viable business proposition". The following year, the council announced the scheme would be scrapped, to be replaced with housing and a small number of commercial units.
