= List of people from Ashford, Kent =

This is a list of people from Ashford in South East England. It may include people from the town of Ashford and the wider Borough of Ashford, in Kent.

- Alexander Arnold (born 1992), actor, plays character Richard Hardbeck on Skins; born in Ashford
- Bob Astles (1924–2012), former associate of Ugandan presidents Milton Obote and Idi Amin; born in Ashford
- Alfred Austin (1835–1913), poet, appointed Poet Laureate in 1896; died in Ashford
- Alex Brooker (born 1984), comedian, journalist and co-host of The Last Leg; lived in Ashford.
- Ben Brown (born 1960), journalist and news presenter; born in Ashford
- Craig Buckham (born 1983), cricketer
- Patsy Byrne (1933–2014), actress, known for playing Nursie in the BBC sitcom Blackadder II; born in Ashford
- Roger Dean (born 1944), artist featured on the album covers of the band Yes; born in Ashford
- Lisa Dobriskey (born 1983), won the Commonwealth Gold 1500m athletics event in 2006; born in Ashford
- Josh Doyle (born 1981), guitarist, singer and founder of hitmakers the Dumdums; currently a solo artist working out of Nashville Tennessee; born in the area
- Sir John Fogge (c.1417–1490) He built and endowed the church at Ashford, Kent as well as the College at Ashford. He was buried in the church, where he is also commemorated in a memorial window
- Frederick Forsyth (1938–2025), author and occasional political commentator, known for thrillers such as The Day of the Jackal, The Dogs of War, The Odessa File, Icon and The Fist of God; born in Ashford
- Barry Fuller (born 1984), professional football player; born in Ashford
- John Fuller (born 1937), poet and author; Fellow Emeritus at Magdalen College, Oxford; born in Ashford
- Stephen Hills (1771–1844), architect, designed the original Pennsylvania State Capitol in Harrisburg; born in Ashford
- Bob Holness, (1928–2012), television presenter; born in Ashford, attended Norton Knatchbull Grammar School
- Richard Huckle (1986–2019), convicted sex offender; dubbed "Britain's worst paedophile"; born in Ashford
- Sir Sydney Nicholson (1875–1947), choir director, organist and composer; founder of the Royal School of Church Music; died in Ashford
- Dudley Pope (1925–1997), writer; born in Ashford
- William Pomfret (1823-1902), Conservative politician, magistrate and MP for Ashford
- Vic Reeves (born 1959), comedian, actor, television presenter; lives in the area
- Neil Ruddock (born 1968) professional footballer played for Tottenham Hotspur, Southampton, Liverpool and other clubs; born in Ashford, attended Norton Knatchbull Grammar School
- Mark Rylance (born 1960), actor and theatre director; born in Ashford
- Sir Malcolm Sargent (1895–1967), conductor, organist and composer; born in Ashford
- Gerald Sithole (born 2002), professional footballer played for Gillingham and Bolton Wanderers, born in Ashford.
- Jamie Staff (born 1973), BMX cycling world champion; track cycling Commonwealth Games and world championship gold medalist; born in Ashford
- Oli Sykes (born 1986), vocalist for alternative metal band Bring Me the Horizon; born in Ashford
- Eric Thiman (1900–1975), English composer
- James Tredwell (born 1982), Kent and England One Day International cricketer; born in the area
- Tom Varndell (born 1985), professional rugby union player; born in Ashford
- Dr John Wallis, (1616–1703), internationally recognised as one of the greatest mathematicians, credited by Sir Isaac Newton as being the founder of his theory of gravity; born in Ashford
- Simone Weil (1909–1943), French philosopher and mystic, died in Grosvenor Sanatorium and is buried in the town's Bybrook Cemetery
- John Wells (1936–1998), actor, writer and satirist; began his television career as a writer on That Was The Week That Was; born in Ashford
