= Jasmin Vardimon =

UK-based choreographer, dancer and artistic director

Jasmin Vardimon MBE
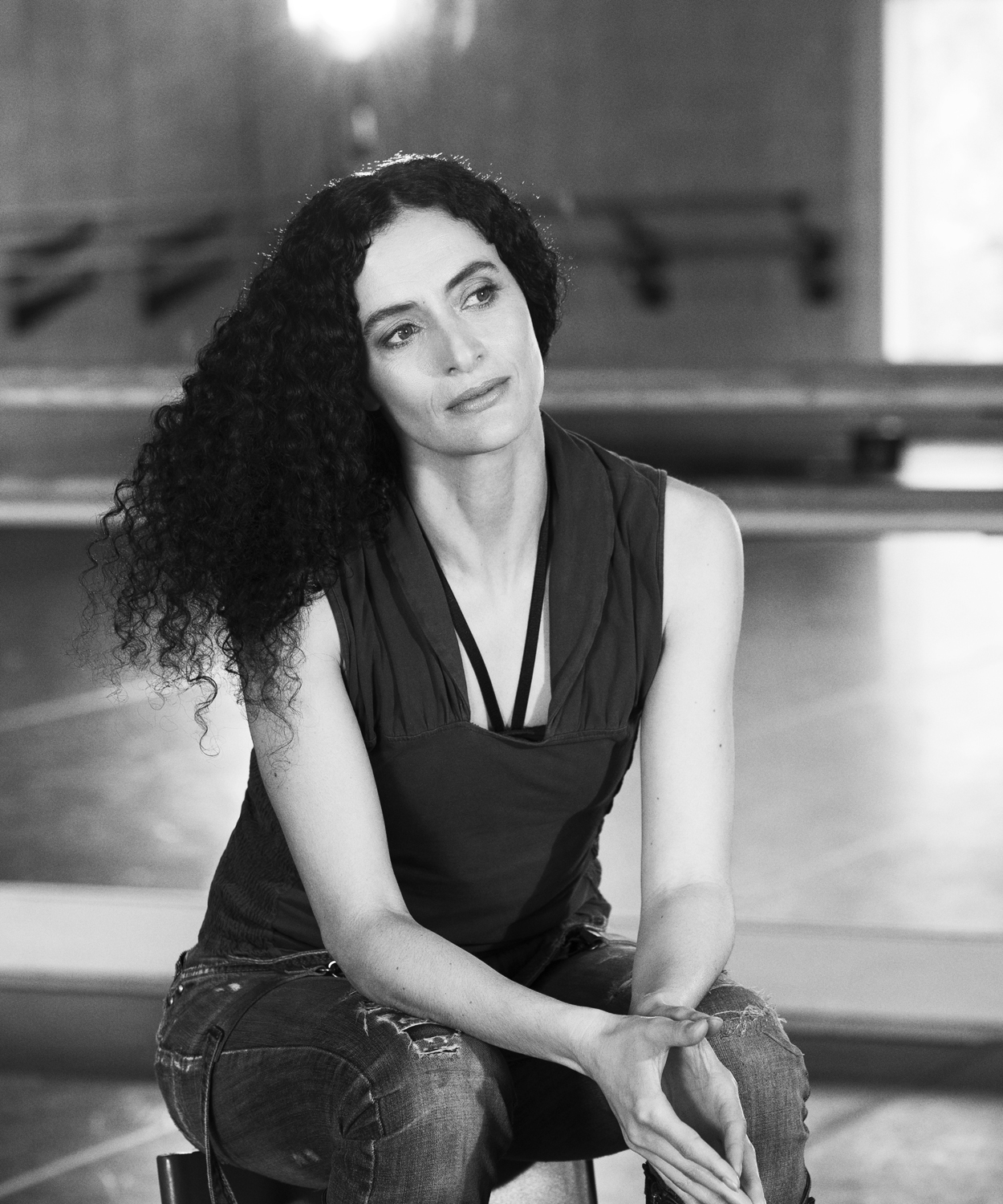
- Born: 1 February 1971 (age 55)
- Occupations: Choreographer, Dancer & Artistic Director of Jasmin Vardimon Company
- Website: Company website

Jasmin Vardimon MBE (born 1971) is a UK-based choreographer, dancer and artistic director of the Jasmin Vardimon Company, which she formed in 1998 in the UK. Vardimon is an associate artist at Sadler's Wells Theatre, since 2006.

Vardimon has been recognized by the International Theatre Institute (ITI) receiving in 2013 the award for Excellence in International Dance, in recognition of her choreographic work over recent years. Vardimon's contributions to dance and theatre were also recognized by Royal Holloway, University of London, receiving an Honorary Doctorate in 2014. In 2018 she received an honorary fellowship from the Institute of the Arts Barcelona.

Vardimon was appointed Member of the Order of the British Empire (MBE) in the 2022 Birthday Honours for services to dance.

== Career ==
The Jasmin Vardimon Company (formerly Zbang Dance Company) was founded in London in 1998 and incorporated in 2001.

Vardimon became an associate artist at The Place (1998), and a Yorkshire Dance Partner (1999- 2005). In 2004, Jasmin Vardimon Company became an Arts Council England Regular Funded Organisation (RFO) and since has been supported as an Arts Council England’s National Portfolio Organisation (NPO).

To date two books have been published which explore Jasmin’s work: Jasmin Vardimon’s Dance Theatre, Movement, Memory and Metaphor (2017) by Libby Worth, published by Routledge and Justitia and Multidisciplinary Readings of the Work of the Jasmin Vardimon Company (2016), edited by Paul Johnson and Sylwia Dobkowska, published by Intellect. These are part of the education resources which the company offer.

== Early age ==
Vardimon grew up in a Kibbutz Ein Hahoresh in central Israel. After years of doing athletics and gymnastics she then began dancing at the age of 14. Vardimon became a member of the Kibbutz Contemporary Dance Company for five years and in 1995 moved to Europe after winning the British Council ‘On the Way to London’ Choreography Award.

== Jasmin Vardimon Company ==
Jasmin Vardimon Company tours nationally and internationally, performing at theatres throughout the UK and internationally.

Vardimon’s choreography is known for its mixture of physical theatre, technologies, text and dance.

The Jasmin Vardimon Company relocated to Ashford, Kent in 2012. In 2022 JV H.O.M.E was opened, a purpose built building, dedicated to the company’s research, creation and multi-disciplinary creative learning programme. JV H.O.M.E became the company's new creative home. The studios and production space are dedicated to the company's creative research and future productions, as well as education programmes, community engagement and multi-disciplinary artistic study. JV H.O.M.E is supported by Kent County Council and Arts Council England.

Jasmin Vardimon Company is funded regularly by the Arts Council England and has also been commissioned by arts institutions and funding bodies such as Sadler's Wells Theatre, Brighton Dome, Kent County Council, The Place, Marlowe Theatre, The Lowry, La Comète (France), National Theatre Studio, South East Dance, Hall for Cornwall, Exeter Northcott Theatre, Take Art, Soho Theatre, DanceXchange, Gardner Arts, Lichfield Garrick Theatre, Laban Centre, Welsh Independent Dance, Yorkshire Dance, Esmée Fairbairn Foundation, Jerwood Foundation, Ovalhouse and the Gulbenkian.

== Works ==
- 2026 - Lullaby for Jasmin Vardimon Company
- 2025 - Yesterday for Staatstheater Braunschweig, Germany
- 2024 - NOW for Jasmin Vardimon Company
- 2024 - Choreography for Carmen at Glyndebourne Opera
- 2023 - Q for MIR Dance Company, Germany
- 2022 - ALiCE for Jasmin Vardimon Company
- 2021 - Alice in VR Wonderland (virtual reality dance performance) for Jasmin Vardimon Company
- 2021 - Canvas for JV2 2021
- 2020 - Dark Moon for JV2 2020
- 2020* - BodyMap for Jasmin Vardimon Company
- 2019 - Tomorrow for JV2 2019
- 2019 - (In Between) for Ballet Central
- 2018 - Medusa for Jasmin Vardimon Company, premiered at the Gulbenkian.
- 2018 - Choreography for Paloma Faith's single, Loyal
- 2018 - (In Between) for JV2 2018
- 2017 - Tomorrow for JV2 2017
- 2016 - Pinocchio for Jasmin Vardimon Company
- 2016 - Tomorrow for Hellenic Dance Company, Athens Greece
- 2016 - Tannhäuser for Royal Opera House, London
- 2015 - (In Between) for JV2 2015
- 2015 - MAZE for Jasmin Vardimon Company
- 2015 - Tannhäuser for Lyric Opera of Chicago
- 2014 - Park for Jasmin Vardimon Company
- 2014 - Tomorrow for JV2 2014
- 2013 - (In Between) for National Youth Dance Company (NYDC)
- 2013 - Yesterday for Bitef Theatre, Belgrade Serbia
- 2013 - Choreography for Atlantis BBC drama (Episode 2)
- 2013 - Tomorrow for JV2 2013
- 2012 - Freedom for Jasmin Vardimon Company
- 2012 - Home for OperaShots season with composer Graham Fitkin, Royal Opera House 2
- 2011 - Shabbat for Decade Tour, Bare Bones, UK
- 2010 - 7734 for Jasmin Vardimon Company
- 2010 - Tannhäuser for Royal Opera House, London
- 2008 - Yesterday for Jasmin Vardimon Company
- 2007 - Because for Hellenic Dance Company, Athens Greece
- 2007 - Justitia for Jasmin Vardimon Company
- 2005 - Park for Jasmin Vardimon Company
- 2003 - Lullaby for Jasmin Vardimon Company
- 2002 - DisEase Room for Welsh Independent Dance, Cardiff
- 2002 - Oh Mr. Grin for Transition Dance Company, UK
- 2001 - Ticklish for Jasmin Vardimon Company
- 2001 - Shabbat for Bare Bones, Birmingham, UK
- 2000 - LureLureLure for Jasmin Vardimon Company
- 1999 - Tête for Jasmin Vardimon Company
- 1998 - Madame Made for Jasmin Vardimon Company
- 1997 - Therapist for Jasmin Vardimon Company
- 1995 - Echo Isn't there for Suzanne Dellal Centre, Israel
- 1993 - Mr. Hole in the Head for Suzanne Dellal Centre, Israel
- 1992 - Master Morality for Suzanne Dellal Centre, Israel
- 1991 - Lo Tinaf for Suzanne Dellal Centre, Israel

== Awards and recognitions ==
- 2023 - Jasmin received Honorary Ambassador of Ashford Award
- 2022 - Awarded MBE in the Queen's Birthday Honours, for her service to dance.
- 2019 - Nominated for Best Choreography at the UK Music Video Awards for her choreography for Loyal
- 2018 - Honorary fellowship from the Institute Arts Barcelona.
- 2014 - Honorary doctorate from Royal Holloway, University of London
- 2014 - The Kent Culture Award's Artist Award
- 2014 - Arts Council England's Exceptional Award in partnership with Turner Contemporary
- 2014 - Destination East Kent Award
- 2014 - Canterbury Award
- 2013 - The International Theatre Institute (ITI) Award for Excellence in International Dance
- 2013 - Dimitrije Parlić Award, Serbia's Choreography Award
- 2013 - Invited by Sadler's Wells to become the first Artistic Director for the newly formed National Youth Dance Company
- 2011-14 - Visiting Professor at Wolverhampton University
- 2006–present - Associate Artist at Sadler's Wells
- 2004 - Jerwood Foundation's ‘Changing Stages’ Award
- 2003 - A nomination for Best Female Artist at the Critics' Circle National Dance Awards
- 2000 - Jerwood Choreography Award
- 1999-2005 - Yorkshire Dance Partner
- 1998 - The London Arts Board ‘New Choreographers’ Award
- 1998 - Associate Artist at The Place
- 1997 - The Colette Littman Scholarship Award
- 1995 - British Council's "On the Way to London" Prize. (Competition in Israel for young choreographers)

== Education company ==
Jasmin Vardimon has been actively involved within various educational projects and positions.

In 2009 Vardimon developed a Higher Education programme, which has since been led by her company as a Postgraduate Certificate in Physical Theatre for Dancers and Actors at Royal Holloway, University of London.

The Postgraduate Certificate in Physical Theatre for Dancers and Actors is a "Continuing Professional Development course for postgraduate experienced dancers and actors moving into a new area of new work – namely dance theatre. This course introduces new techniques that combine vocal, kinaesthetic and visual skills and responses."

Since September 2011, Vardimon has been a visiting professor at the University of Wolverhampton. Her company donates an annual prize for drama graduates of the university.

In 2012 Vardimon launched JV2, a full-time Professional Development Certificate course at her company's home base in Ashford, Kent.

In 2013 Vardimon was invited by Sadler's Wells Theatre to be the first Artistic Director of the newly formed National Youth Dance Company.

In 2014 she received an honorary doctorate from Royal Holloway, University of London, in recognition of her outstanding achievement in her field, and her contribution to the university and to education generally.

In 2018 she received an honorary fellowship from the Institute Arts Barcelona.

In 2024 she opened JVyoU, a youth company which follows Jasmin’s method, develop technical, creative and performance skills, working with professional Jasmin Vardimon Company dancers and collaborators, aiming to inspire creative development.

== JV2 ==
Jasmin Vardimon Company has formed JV2 in 2012, offering a Professional Development Certificate course, with the aim to develop, encourage and cultivate young talent and young audiences.

It is a practical course designed to bridge the gap between student and professional life, and aims to train participants as versatile and multi-disciplinary performers by exploring the dialogue between dance and theatre, improving strength, endurance and technique. Towards the end of the course the students form a young company, experiencing touring nationally alongside the Jasmin Vardimon Company.
