= Newtown, Kent =

Coordinates: 51.13°N 0.88°E

Newtown
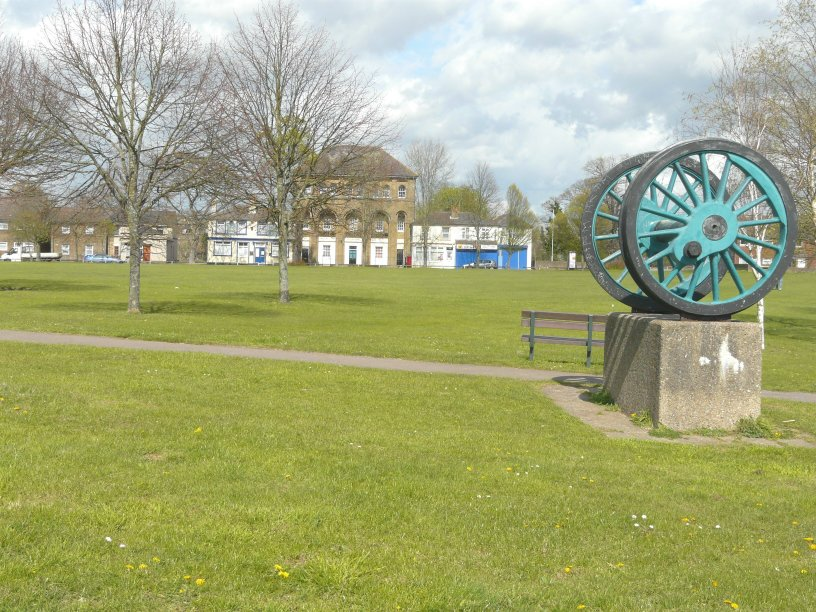

- Location within Kent
- OS grid reference: TR017415
- District: Ashford
- Shire county: Kent
- Region: South East
- Country: England
- Sovereign state: United Kingdom
- Police: Kent
- Fire: Kent
- Ambulance: South East Coast
- UK Parliament: Ashford

Newtown is a suburb of Ashford in Kent, South East England. It was built by the South Eastern Railway (SER), south-east of the railway station, alongside Ashford railway works. Originally designed for railway workers, the estate survived the closure of the works in the late 20th century, which is in the process of being redeveloped.

== History ==
The estate was purchased by the SER in February 1846 for £21,000. The original name was Alfred Town, or Alfred New Town, but it had become known by its present name by 1861. It was laid out in roughly a triangular pattern, with a green in the centre.

The first properties to be built the following year were 72 cottages for workers, including engineers, fitters, smiths, carpenters, painters and other labourers. Further expansion led to a population rise from 3,000 to 5,000 by 1852. In 1861, a school was built, with space for 500 children. The Locomotive pub was constructed in 1866, later being renamed to the Alfred Arms. A carriage shop was constructed between 1858 and 1871; it is now Grade II listed. A mechanics institute and school was constructed on land alongside the Ashford to Hastings line. A clock tower was constructed at the entrance to the works at Newtown in 1897, which was replaced by a free-standing design in 1907. After the works expanded in 1912, a further 126 homes were constructed, making a total of 272.

The town survived as its purpose for housing railway workers into the 20th century. The railway works continued to build and service locomotives after nationalisation of the railways in 1948. The locomotive workshop closed in 1962, while the wagon workshop closed in 1982. However, the area continued to be popular because of the continuing investment in the railway, including the introduction of Eurostar services, and then the High Speed 1 domestic services to London.

In the 21st century, Newtown was redeveloped with the construction of Ashford International Studios, a multi-media complex built on the site of the former railway works. Planning was approved in 2020, with the expectation it would generate 2,000 jobs in the local area. The premises are expected to be complete by 2025.

== See also ==
Ashford Green Corridor, a Local Nature Reserve, includes Newtown Green, adjacent to Newtown.
