= Jasmin Vardimon Company =

UK based dance-theatre company

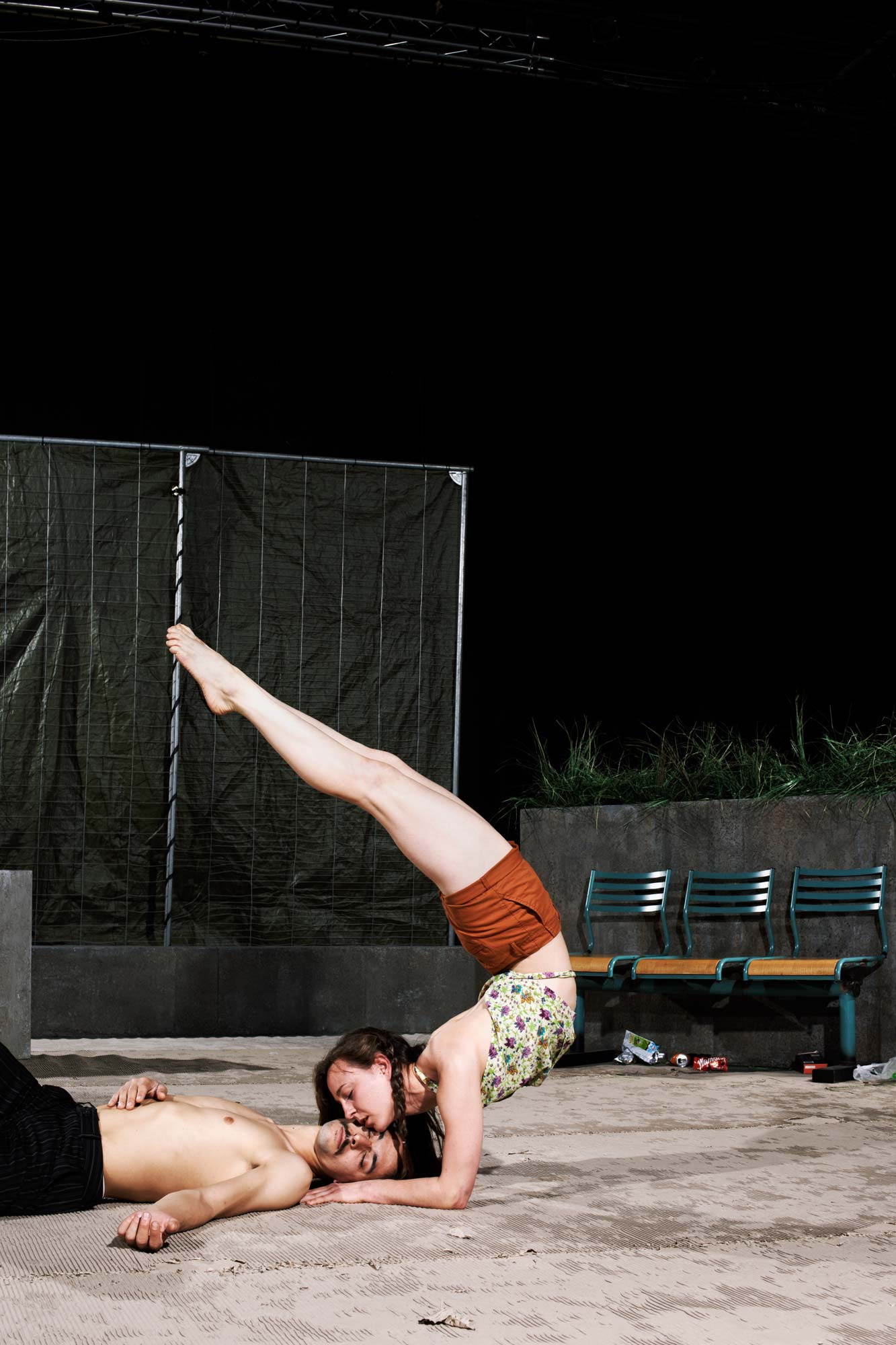
Jasmin Vardimon Company

Jasmin Vardimon Company is a UK based contemporary dance-theatre company. The Company was founded in London in 1998 (incorporated in 2001), and became a significant element within the British dance scene. The company is dedicated to the choreography of Artistic Director, Jasmin Vardimon – Associate Artist of Sadler's Wells Theatre since 2006.

Jasmin Vardimon Company (formerly Zbang Dance Company) produces and tours contemporary dance theatre productions that combines text with movement, voice, animation and technologies. Large and complex set designs are part of their productions, and the company continues to explore new ways of combining various art forms to create multilayered productions that communicate and engage audiences on many different levels. Jasmin Vardimon Company tours throughout the UK and across the globe. Recent tours include, Spain, Germany, Italy, Croatia, Israel, South Korea, and the USA.

The Jasmin Vardimon Company relocated to Ashford, Kent in 2012, opening The Jasmin Vardimon Production Space as its new creative home. The production space is dedicated to the company's creative research and future productions, as well as education residencies and multi-disciplinary artistic study. The production space is supported by Ashford Borough Council, Ashford Leisure Trust and Arts Council England.

Jasmin Vardimon Company is funded regularly by the Arts Council England and has also been commissioned by many arts institutions and funding bodies such as Sadler's Wells Theatre, Brighton Dome, Kent County Council, The Place, Marlowe Theatre, The Lowry, La Comète (France), National Theatre Studio, South East Dance, Hall for Cornwall, Exeter Northcott Theatre, Take Art, Soho Theatre, DanceXchange, Gardner Arts, Lichfield Garrick Theatre, Laban Centre, Welsh Independent Dance, Yorkshire Dance, Esmée Fairbairn Foundation, Jerwood Foundation and Ovalhouse.

== Repertoire ==
- NOW (2024)
- ALiCE (2022)
- BodyMap (2020)
- Medusa (2018)
- Pinocchio (2016)
- MAZE (2015)
- Park (2014)
- Freedom (2012)
- 7734 (2010)
- Yesterday (2008)
- Justitia (2007)
- Park (2005)
- Lullaby (2003)
- Ticklish (2001)
- LureLureLure (2000)
- Tête (1999)
- Madame Made (1998)
- Therapist (1997)

== Educational Company ==
The Jasmin Vardimon Educational Company engages thousands of participants each year, from young people in schools and community projects to professional development programmes.

In 2009, Vardimon developed a Higher Education programme, which has since been led by her company as a Postgraduate Certificate in Physical Theatre for Dancers and Actors at Royal Holloway, University of London.

The Postgraduate Certificate in Physical Theatre for Dancers and Actors is a "Continuing Professional Development course for postgraduate experienced dancers and actors moving into a new area of new work – namely dance theatre. This course introduces new techniques that combine vocal, kinaesthetic and visual skills and responses."

Since September 2011, Vardimon has been a visiting professor at the University of Wolverhampton and Jasmin Vardimon Company donates an annual prize for drama graduates of the university.

In 2012, the Jasmin Vardimon Educational Company launched JV2, a one year Professional Development Certificate course, based in Ashford at the Jasmin Vardimon Production Space. The JV2 course aims to develop, encourage and cultivate young talent and young audiences. It is a practical course designed to bridge the gap between student and professional life, and aims to train participants as versatile and multi-disciplinary performers by exploring the dialogue between dance and theatre, improving strength, endurance and technique. Towards the end of the course the students form a young company, experiencing touring nationally alongside the Jasmin Vardimon Company.

Other community-based projects that the Jasmin Vardimon Educational Company take part in organising and delivering include, INSPIRE, People United, ART31, Big Dance, National Youth Dance Company, Youth Justice System Intensive Week; NHS workshops with Speech Language and Communication Caseload; and Kent Public Health Six Ways to Wellbeing Creative Commissioning projects.
