= Clumping (biology) =

Biological behavior

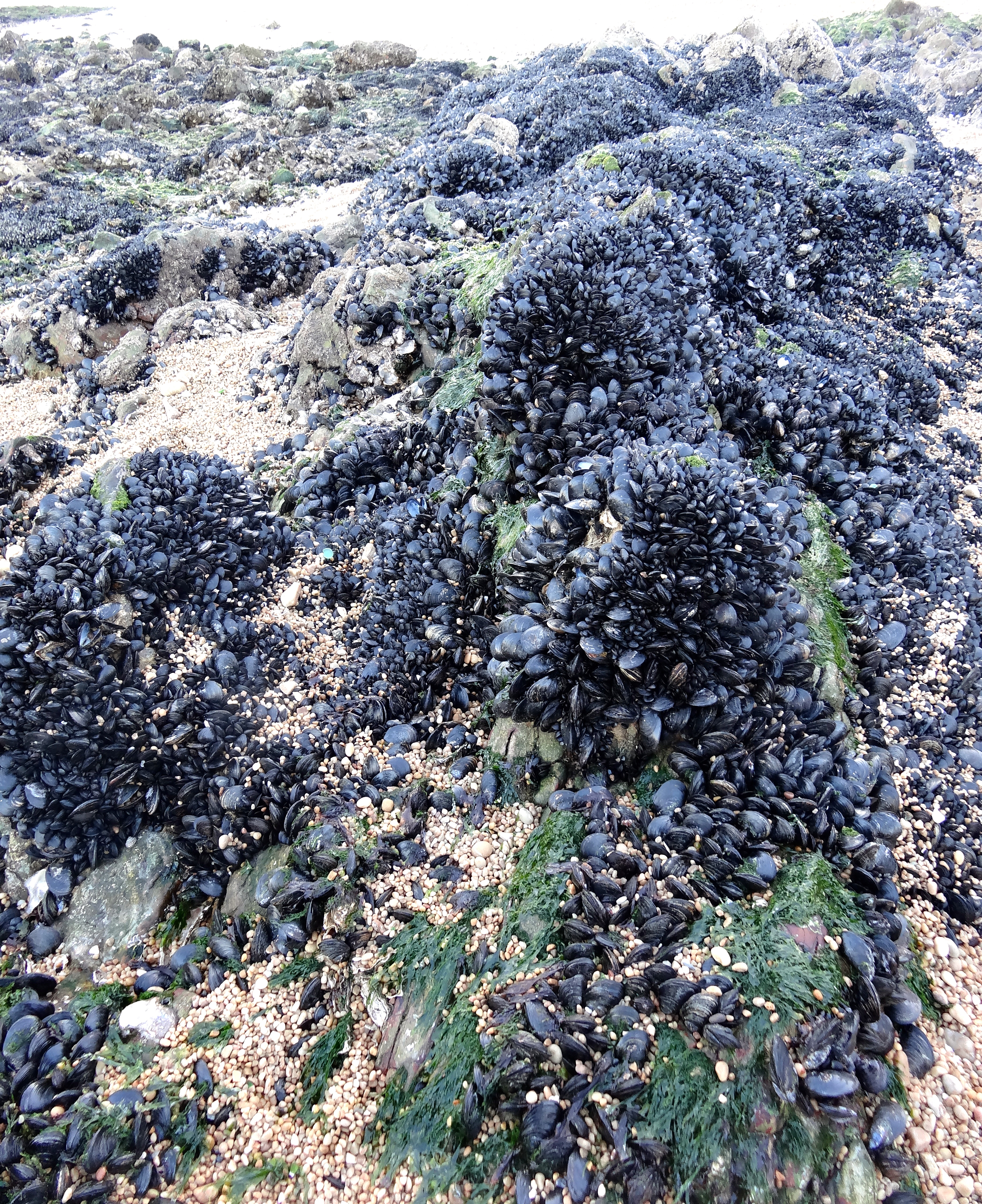
A group of clumped mussels on rocks

Clumping is a behavior in an organism, usually sessile, in which individuals of a particular species group close to one another for beneficial purposes. Clumping can be caused by the abiotic environment surrounding an organism. Barnacles, for example, group together on rocks that are exposed for the least time during the low tide. Usually, clumping in sessile animals starts when one organism binds to a hard substrate, such as rock, and other members of the same species attach themselves afterwards. Herbivorous snails are known to clump around where sufficient algae are present. The clumping of mussels (shown right) has been found to be influenced by competition with other species. The mussels attach themselves by byssal threads to potential competitors for space.

== Causes ==
=== Predation avoidance ===
Clumping and increased locomotion has been found to occur with organisms such as blue mussels (Mytilus edulis) due to risks from predators such as the European lobster (Homarus gammarus). Trade-offs exist with clumping such as decreased growth and less reproductive activity from mussels clumping together due to predation. However, there are also benefits obtained, such as decreased mortality from predation and adverse weather conditions, from clumping.

Clumping has been practiced by bivalve organisms from the times of the fossil record, and the trade-offs between living quite an aggregated lifestyle. Predators such as the gastropod Nucella lamellosa utilize drilling techniques in order to hunt prey such as the blue mussels, and the latter's clumping strategies results in significantly less drilling frequency overall. However, the average drilling placement and variation by the gastropod did not show variation as a result of clumping.

== Measurement ==
Measuring clumped populations of organisms in nature can prove challenging at times for researchers. Quadrat sampling, a favored method by ecologists to study the density of populations, is not as effective with criteria such as those groups that are clumped. Other methods instead can be utilized to measure clumped populations, such as the line-intercept method which is more popular with organisms that can be studied and identified before they move. The reasoning behind organisms clumping revolve around resources being restrained in smaller regions within larger ones and select organisms forming social groups. The funnel-web spider (Agelenopsis aperta) at smaller scales are evenly distributed in their habitats, but are a clumped species on larger scales. The reasoning for this is two-fold. Firstly, these types of spiders prefer environments with the ability to attract insect prey and have favorable thermal properties. Secondly, there is a limited space for spiders to establish their websites, and competition for these spaces is substantial. However, on a macro scale, most organisms actually have clumped distributions due to their habitats not being eventually distributed over extensive areas. Similar trends are seen with other species of spiders. Stegodyphus lineatus sees disadvantages no matter what other parameters exist when feeding in large groups. Otherwise, these types of spiders were able to survive in close proximity most effectively when they were of approximate equal size. The size of groups also played a role in the ability of these spiders to live.

== Cellular clumping ==
The practice of clumping occurs at both the macro and micro level for organisms. Closely tied to the endosymbiotic theory, there exists significant evidence that single-celled organisms in the distant past evolved and combined with other organisms to create complex multi-cellular lifeforms that make up much of life in the present. This was despite the fact that these single-celled organisms were capable of sustaining themselves and reproducing to create future generations. Nevertheless, this occurrence is considered to be a major transition in the evolution of life. The benefits of these multi-cellular lifeforms forming include further advances in efficiency to already existing ways that single-celled organisms cooperated; the creation of extracellular "public goods" is an example of organisms gaining from clumping. However, cooperation could still evolve and coexist alongside clumping as a strategy for organisms. As genetic similarity strengthened between organisms that clumped, both "public goods" production and clumping itself became more prevalent and easier to accomplish in the case of the latter. In addition, just small changes in genetic similarity can cause major shifts the outcome of evolution for organisms, such as increased output of vital materials for survival and growth. Clumping can be impeded when the number of organisms that benefits must be shared with increases, but stimulated when those organisms are more related to one another.
