= Wye College =

Former college in Kent, England

The College of St Gregory and St Martin at Wye
- Other name: Wye College
- Former names: South Eastern Agricultural College; Imperial College at Wye; Wye Grammar School
- Motto: Luce et labore
- Motto in English: By enlightenment and work
- Active: 1447–2009
- Founder: Cardinal John Kempe
- Location: Wye, Kent, England; 51.18400°N 0.93893°E

The College of St Gregory and St Martin at Wye, commonly known as Wye College, was an education and research institution in the village of Wye, Kent. In 1447, Cardinal John Kempe founded his chantry there which educated local children. As of 2020, it is an example of medieval chantry college buildings.

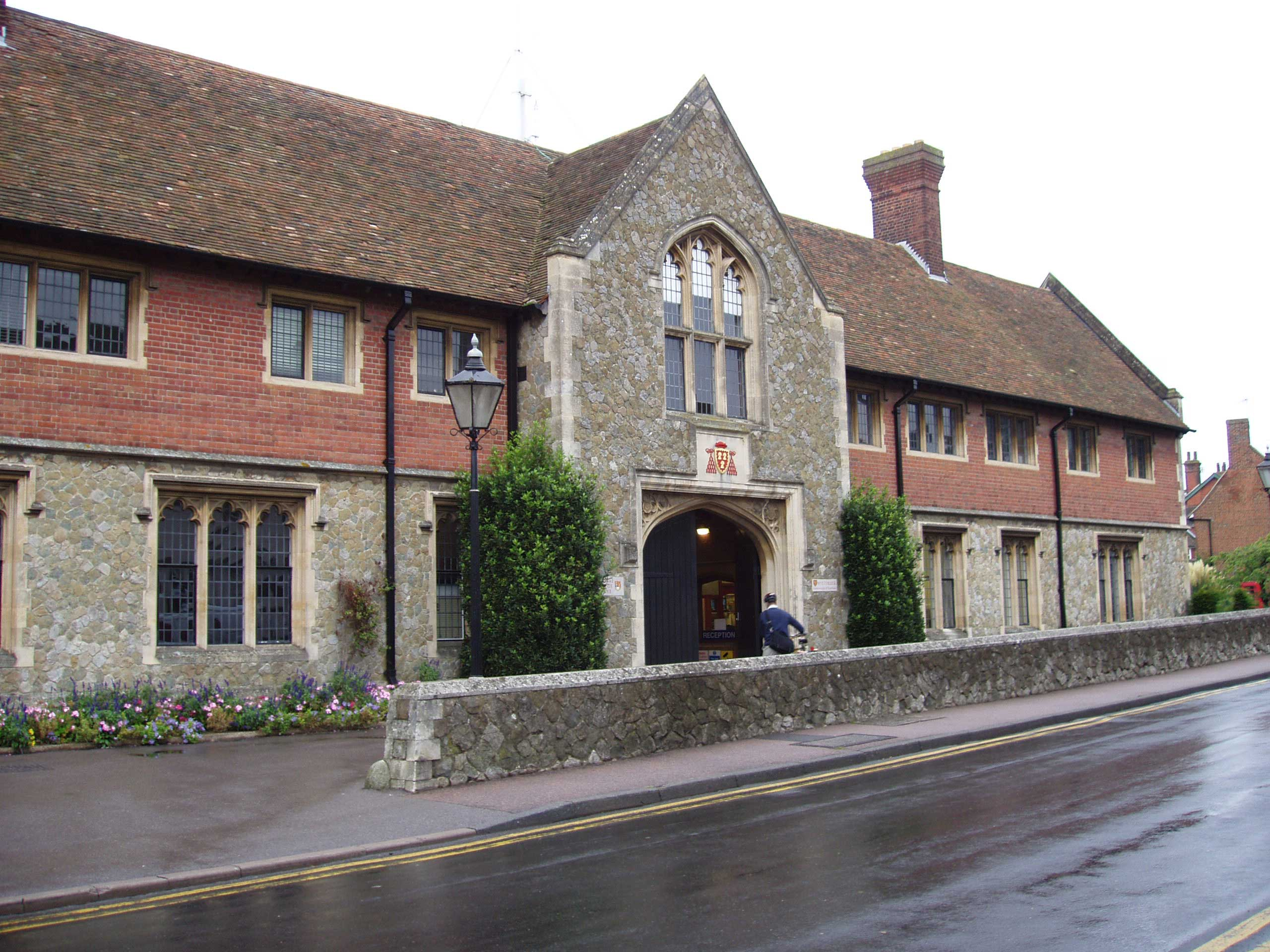
Wye College, 1984

After abolition in 1545, parts of the premises were occupied as mansion, grammar school, charity school, infant school and national school, They were purchased by Kent and Surrey County Councils to provide men's technical education. For over a hundred years Wye became a school and later a college, of London University most concerned with rural subjects. Chemist Louis Wain developed synthetic auxin selective herbicides 2,4-DB, MCPB and Bromoxynil at Wye in the 1950s alongside his other research into insecticides, plant growth regulators and fungicides. Wain's colleague Gerald Wibberley created an emphasis on land use and the environment.

Following a 1947 merger with Swanley Horticultural College for women, Wye transformed from an agricultural college to a university level for a of national and international students. Successive phases of expansion developed the college's campus a hall of residence, and an estate of nearly 1,000 acres (400 ha). After a 2000 merger with Imperial College and controversial 2005 attempt to build 4,000 houses, Imperial College at Wye closed in 2009.

As of 2010, postgraduate distance learning programme created at Wye College continued within SOAS. Many of the college buildings have been redeveloped for community use or occasional public access.

== History ==
=== Chantry ===
Church leaders from the 14th century were concerned by the influence of John Wyclif and his fellow Lollards on the Weald and Romney Marsh. They felt priests educated in Latin and theology, living in the community, would be better able to counter circulation of heretical interpretation. The Church authorities could punish dissenters, or have them burnt as at Wye in 1557. Several chantries were established in the vicinity, at least in part for this purpose.

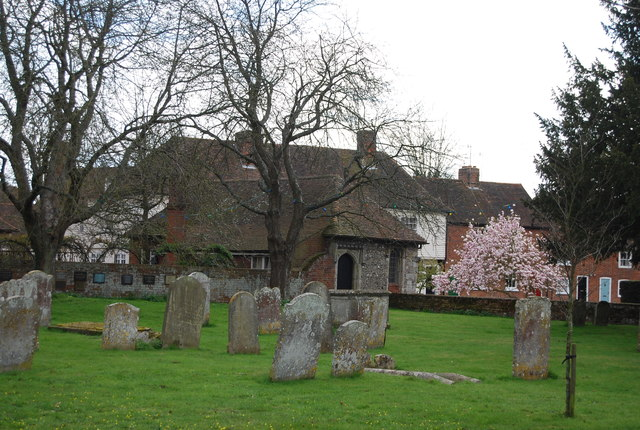
Latin School from Wye Churchyard, 2012

In 1432, John Kempe, the Archbishop of York and a native of adjoining Olantigh, was granted royal license by King Henry VI to found the College of Saints Gregory and Martin in the parish of Wye. In 1447 after protracted negotiation, he obtained about an acre of land, including dwellings known as Shalewell, Goldsmyth and Shank, from the Abbot and Convent of Battle who owned the Manor of Wye. Kempe constructed the Latin School, and buildings around a cloistered quadrangle for the accommodation of secular priests. There were up to ten priests in his chantry. Kempe rebuilt Wye Church in 1447 and Archbishop of Canterbury, John Stafford granted its vicarship to the college. The priests acted as a college of canons for the now collegiate church; performed their chantry duties for the Kempes' souls, and included a teacher of grammar (Latin). The master had to be a scholar of theology and member of Kempe's alma mater, Merton College.

Kempe's statutes required the college to teach all scholars free, both rich and poor, though as a welcome seasonal exception grateful students could reward the schoolmaster with gifts of fowl and pennies on Saint Nicholas Day, confuetam galloram & denariorum Sancti Nicholai gratuitam oblationem.

The dedication to Saint Gregory and Saint Martin mirrors that of Kempe's adjoining church. An earlier 1290 Wye Church, on the site, had been solely named for Saint Gregory. The further reference, at both the college and church, to Saint Martin may have been to recognise the contribution of Battle Abbey, itself dedicated to him.

By 1450, Wye College had appropriated the pilgrim's church at Boughton Aluph, and acquired land in Canterbury, Wye, Boughton Aluph, Crundale, Godmersham, Bethersden and Postling. King Edward IV granted it the west Kent coast churches of Newington, Brenzett and Broomhill in 1465.

The rules were not universally upheld. In 1511, Master Goodhewe was reported to Archbishop Warham for appointing himself, rather than other fellows, to the College's remunerated positions, and taking the entire benefit of its endowment to the neglect of divine service and the cure of souls. He failed to annually proclaim Kempe's statutes and maintained a relationship with a woman, in breach of them. Goodhewe also found time to be Rector of Staplehurst without papal dispensation to hold two incompatible benefices. But he was not removed from office for his misconduct.

By 1534 the college had annual gross income of £125 15s 4 1/2d, or over £94,000 at 2022 values.

Masters of Wye College 1448–1545
Richard Ewan	Appointed 1448
Thomas Gauge	In post 1450, resigned 1462
Nicholas Wright	Appointed 1462, in post 1470
John Goodhewe	Appointed 1500, ceased 1519
Richard Waltare / Walker	In post 1525, 1534, 1535
Edward Bowden	Surrendered the college 1545

Other partially surviving chantry colleges near Wye include the larger Maidstone, and smaller Cobham Colleges. Traces remain at Ashford.

=== After abolition ===
The college was surrendered in 1545 under the Abolition of Chantries Act of that year, its assets appropriated for the Court of Augmentations. An inventory was valued at £7 1s 1d plus a silver salt at £3; silver spoons at 27s 6d, and two old masters at 6s 8d.

Apart from its principal buildings the college owned nearby Perry Court, and Surrenden manors, together with the rectory and advowson of Broomhill on Romney Marsh. It was entitled to annual payments of 33s 4d from Westwell rectory, 10s from Hothfield rectory and 8s from Eastwell rectory. The college owned other land in Wye, Withersdane, Naccolt, Hinxhill, Godmersham, Crundale, Great Chart, Bethersden, Postling, Westbury and Broomhill.

These properties were alienated first to Catherine Parr's Secretary, Walter Buckler for £200, who promptly sold them in 1546 to his brother in law, and property speculator, Maurice Denys. Following Denys' disgrace the college was acquired by William Damsell in 1553, thence passing on death in 1582 to his four daughters.

As the seized lands passed from the Crown, and onwards, they did so subject to conditions, echoing Kempe's statutes, requiring the owners to "at all times provide and maintain a sufficient Schoolmaster capable of teaching boys and young lads in the art of Grammar, without fee or reward, in this parish". Those terms were met haphazardly in the coming years. In 1557, Archdeacon Harpsfield urged William Damsell be reminded of his obligations. Damsell had only been paying £9 of the £17 due each year, even though his former college lands in Wye alone gave him annual rents of £80. Harpsfield's treatment of Damsell was lenient by comparison to the two Protestants he ordered burnt to death at Wye that same year. By 1596 it was noted, during a Commission of Inquiry at Deptford, that payments to a Wye schoolmaster required under the college's original transfer to Buckler were no longer being made.

The college buildings were occupied as a substantial private residence in 1610 for the Twysden family, incorporating the extant, fine Jacobean staircase and imposing fireplaces to the Hall and Parlour. The family may have previously occupied it as tenants of lawyer Henry Haule.

In about 1626, King Charles I granted the forfeit former Wye College rectories of Boughton Aluph, Brenzett and Newington to reward his loyal supporter Robert Maxwell. The proviso was added Maxwell and his successors paid £16 per year, which reinstated the lapsed stipend for a Wye schoolmaster. Years later the sum would be diminished by inflation and several holders of the position faced short tenure and great financial hardship.

With salary back in place, the following year a grammar school for boys opened in part of the college though the southern range continued to be used as a private house in ownership of the Winchilsea Finch family from Eastwell. Restoration poet Ann Finch and her husband Heneage lived quietly at Wye College from 1690 to 1708 to avoid persecution at Court for their Jacobite sympathies. Several of her works refer directly or indirectly to the college and their time there, including reaction to a chimney fire in 1702.

Wye College's grammar school did not achieve the prominence of rival Eton College though its alumni included notables such as journalist Alaric Alexander Watts and Robert Plot, first keeper of Oxford's Ashmolean Museum. In 1762 there were 40 boarders and 100-day pupils but during other periods considerably less, if any at all. Sometimes the position was treated as little more than a sinecure.

In 1868 the grammar school's position was bleak. Although teaching of classics was free, locals were concerned about increasing costs for tuition in other subjects. The school had only four boarders despite a capacity for 40. An alternative curriculum was considered and unless changes were made, an inspector concluded it would be hard to "keep a good master for £16 and half a house".

Headmasters of Wye Grammar School
William Clifton (Note: Probably the William Clifton who was master of Faversham School in 1534 and son of Richard Clifton, fellow and school master of the college before surrender)	In office 1557, 1569, 1581
Isaac Nicholls (Note: Son of Puritan Josias Nicholls)	In office 1602
Surety-on-High Nicholls (Note: Descendant of Josias Nicholls. Headmaster of Sutton Valence School 1659–1660)	In office 1642
Henry Bradshaw (Note: May have been father of poet Richard Bradshaw based upon a common association with Henry Oxenden)	1640s
William Fenby	In office 1661
Jeremy Dodson	In office 1664
John Paris (Note: Master of King's School in 1661)	1665–1677
Robert Wrentmore (Note: Previously headmaster of Sandwich Free Grammar School)	In office 1684
Samuel Pratt	In office 1684
John Warham	In office 1714
Thomas Turner	In office 1717
Johnson Towers	1754–1762
Philip Parsons	1762–1812
W T Ellis	1812–1815
Charles Knowles	1815–1816
William Morris	1817–1832
Robert Billing (Note: Father of Bishop Robert Billing)	1834–1854
William Bell	1854–1855
Samuel Cummings	1855–1855
Edward Ollivant	1855–1866
George Frederick Noade	1866–1867
John Major	1867–1870
Henry Holmes	1870–1878

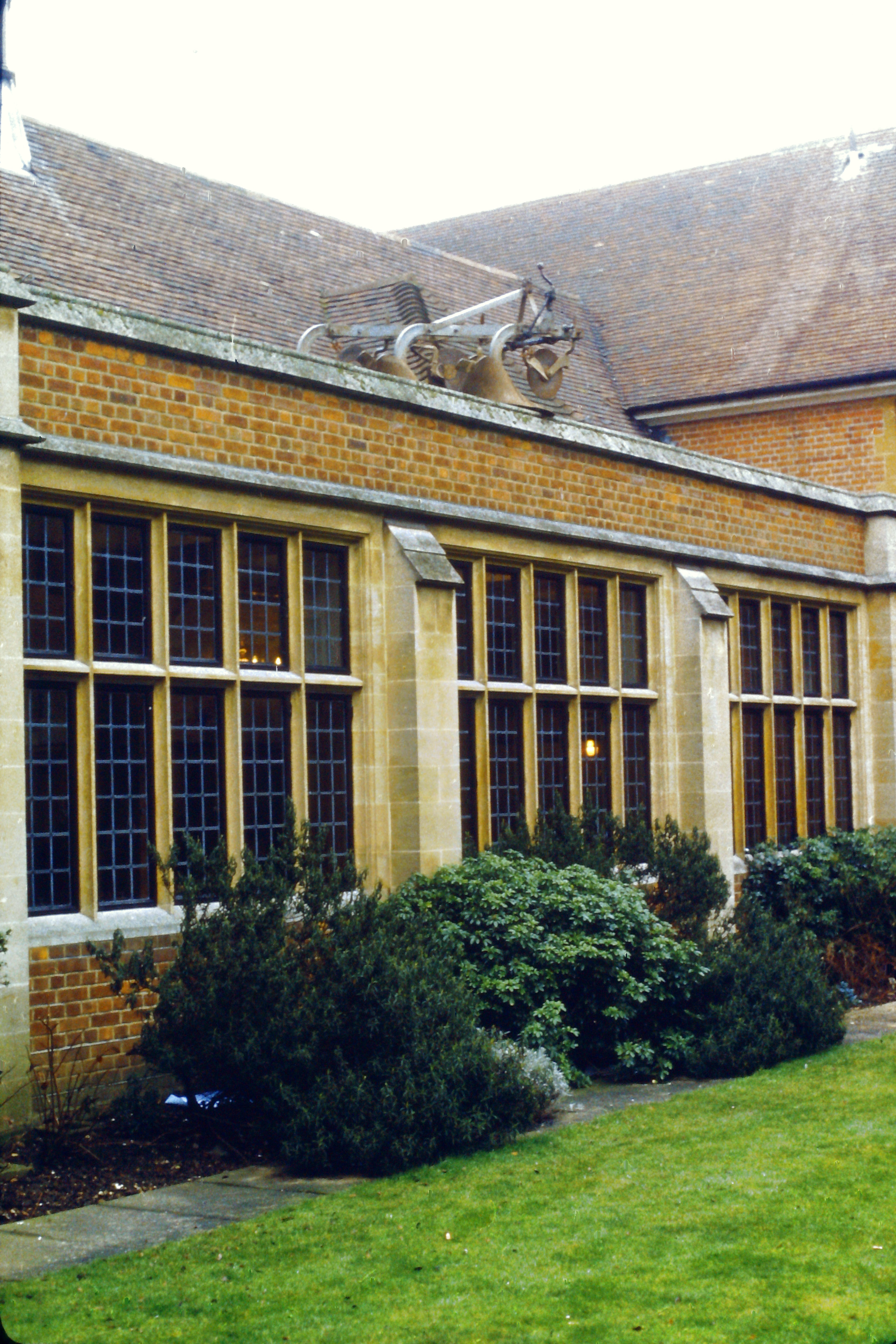
Wye College dining hall, 1983

=== Lady Joanna Thornhill School ===
Cardinal Kempe's nephew Thomas Kempe sold Olantigh to Sir Timothy Thornhill in 1607. The 1708 will of Lady Joanna Thornhill, the daughter of Sir Bevil Grenville, second wife of descendant Richard Thornhill, and Woman of the Bedchamber to Queen Catherine of Braganza provided funds to care for and educate the children of Wye. Her trust purchased parts of the college buildings and other property for that purpose.

Sir George Wheler, who some sources claim was Lady Joanna Thornhill's nephew, acquired the private mansion – the southern range, garden, outbuildings and Latin School in 1713. He had been a pupil at Wye Grammar School but "learnt little" there.

That transaction left the college part owned by Lady Thornhill's trust and, on Wheler's death in 1724, part by his. A grammar school still operated in the Latin School and buildings around the cloister.

The grammar school headmaster received free personal accommodation from Wheler's trust, use of the Latin School for classes and the £16, but had to pay rent to Thornhill's trust for other school space. The Thornhill trust operated its own charity schools for boys and girls in the Old Hall and Parlour respectively. Their schoolmaster received £30 per annum salary and the school mistress £20, from rent on property purchased in Wye and on Romney Marsh.

By the late 18th century there were over 100 children attending Lady Thornhills school. In 1839, rather than join the non-denominational British and Foreign School Society it affiliated with the Church of England's National Society for Promoting Religious Education, becoming a national school.

Wheler's will provided an annual £10 exhibition, increased to £20 by his son, for local boys from Lady Thornhill's charity school to receive instruction at Wye Grammar School and then attend Lincoln College. The scholarship was funded by the rent charge on a house in Whitehall which Wheler owned. Unfortunately by 1790, that charge had become impossible to collect. Its absence was still greatly lamented, nearly a century later, both by Wye Grammar School and Lincoln College.

Trustees of Lady Thornhill's charity school, requiring more space for girls, converted an outbuilding at the south east of the grammar school garden for the purpose. The space, with extant exposed crown post roof, belonging to Sir George Wheler's trust became known as the college Wheelroom.

Nevertheless, the situation was poor. An inspector passed the facilities "but with the greatest reluctance". He observed the Old Hall used as boys' schoolroom "though a fine old room, is ill-adapted for a school and requires constant repair", and bemoaned that "as long as they are allowed to use this old room, the inhabitants of Wye will not lift a finger towards the erection of new schools". His conclusion was that Wye "has about the worst schools in the neighbourhood".

In 1878 the Wheler / Thornhill trusts and operation of the grammar and charity school premises they owned were combined, and two years later to comply with the Elementary Education Act 1870 the girls' Wheelroom was leased to Wye and Brook School Board for use as an infant school.

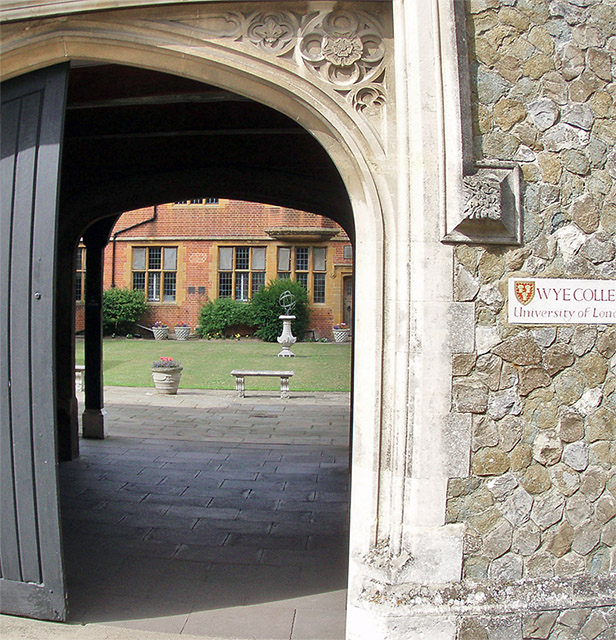
Main entrance, 2009

Headmasters of Lady Joanna Thornhill School
Edward Vincer	In office 1797
William Adams	In office c. 1820, c. 1842
Henry Holmes	1855–1859
John Herbert	Appointed 1859, in office 1862

=== South Eastern Agricultural College ===
Duty imposed upon beer and spirits under the Local Taxation (Customs and Excise) Act 1890 (53 & 54 Vict. c. 60), commonly known as Whiskey Money, was intended to compensate licensees in the country required to close. It created an income which Sir Arthur Dyke Acland instead proposed to Parliament be earmarked for the new county councils to spend on technical instruction. His amendment, it is reported, was adopted by a lethargic and half empty house.

There were some institutions offering short courses in Agriculture but very few opportunities for degree courses. The Normal School of Science, shortly to merge and form Imperial College, had only graduated seven agricultural students per year between 1878 and 1887. There had been proposals for a single, central agricultural university, potentially near Derby, but no appetite for a network of them or state funding. However nationally, now county councils chose to spend £80,000 per year of the Whiskey Money specifically for agricultural education.

The combined Lady Thornhill Trust owned its school premises; nearby Amage Farm, and agricultural land on Romney Marsh. An 1891 proposal from the Earl of Winchilsea envisaged this should be the basis of a 40 male student agricultural college for Kent, Surrey and Sussex, funded by Whiskey Money. East and West Sussex County Councils dropped out of the scheme, and the farms were not immediately available, but negotiations took place for newly formed Kent County Council and Surrey County Council to purchase the school premises and a lease was arranged for 250 acres (100 ha) of land at Coldharbour Farm from Erle-Drax's Olantigh Estate. Coldharbour was considered difficult, inhospitable, and a suitable challenge for the college to prove its ability to local farmers.

In 1892, Kent and Surrey county councils obtained the old chantry premises for £1,000, the schools moving to a new building on land Lady Thornhill's trust owned in Bridge Street, and in 1894 opened the South Eastern Agricultural College there. They appointed chemist, socialist and former schoolmaster Alfred Daniel Hall as principal and he opened with thirteen students. It was then the first and only college founded and maintained by public money solely for the benefit of agriculture in England. Hall's student roll grew to 46 in 1900; 71 in 1902, and 124 in 1913.

Unconventionally for a college of agriculture, Hall chose to appoint teaching staff that were scientists rather than agriculturalists with some scientific insight, and at opening, none had agricultural experience. He later accepted that with his initial over-emphasis on basic science the establishment was fortunate to be accepted so quickly by the farming community. Rather than entrust the new college's farm to Hall's team the governors chose to run it themselves with the help of a bailiff. It was not until Frank Baybrook Smith briefly joined the college to teach agriculture that the governors felt sufficiently confident in the academic team to relinquish direct control of the college farm.

Between 1892 and 1894, the existing buildings were extensively refurbished at a cost of £18,000; a lecture theatre (Old Lecture Theatre) was abutted to the Parlour repurposed as a library, and biological laboratory (Lecture Room A) constructed north west of the cloister range. Original accommodation to the south of the cloister housed the principal. A chemistry laboratory was arranged in the Wheelroom, and housekeeping wing formed between it and the cloister range to service a refectory in the Old Hall. First floor space north of the cloister, and above the new biological laboratory and housekeeping wing, provided 20 student rooms. Others were to be accommodated in village houses.

Entomologist of independent means, Frederick Theobald joined the opening college as lecturer in agricultural zoology, and later became vice-principal. He remained at Wye throughout his career. Theobald's work transitioned a discipline that had been a matter of simply collecting insects to the study of damage they did to crops and how to mitigate it. He spent much of his time curating economic zoology and mosquito collections at the British Museum, and ceased lecturing at Wye from 1920 in favour of agricultural extension. Theobald's research on mosquitos and tropical sanitation earned him international recognition including the Order of Osmanieh and Mary Kingsley Medal. He lived at Wye Court until death in 1930, his coffin carried from there by former colleagues and students to Wye Church for burial.

In its early years only about a fifth of the South Eastern Agricultural College student intake was for three-year qualifications. Others undertook short, more applied instruction for two-year diplomas, or leading to a single year certificate. Short courses were provided, for instance to local school teachers tasked with instructing their pupils in nature topics.

As well as teaching and research, academics and other staff at the South Eastern Agricultural College, throughout its existence, provided agricultural extension services to farmers and growers in the south-east of England. Hall gave book-keeping and other advice to the Guinness hop farms; Ernest Stanley Salmon helped hop and other growers combat fungi, while Theobald advised those confronting crop pests. Their colleagues dealt with all manner of technical requirements, even designing an innovative aerating sewage treatment plant for nearby Olantigh.

Complementing individual consultations and publications, college staff toured the south-east of England giving lectures to agricultural or rural organisations on "fruit growing, farriery, poultry, bee keeping, and numerous veterinary topics", sometimes in migratory vans specially prepared for these roadshows. In Wye they regularly gave talks to the village school, and the laboratories offered a service analysing soil, forage and milk, and performing veterinary post-mortems.

At the end of its first year of operation Wye's College had cost Kent and Surrey county councils £25,000 split 3:2 in their agreed proportions. The two counties combined technical education budget at the time was only £37,000 per year. In addition to their normal annual contributions the counties had to make exceptional 1895 payments to cover their college's deficit and stringent cost cutting was enforced in place of the earlier largess. Grants from the Board of Agriculture and those changes put the college back onto a sound financial footing ready for further premises expansion.

Going forward, and particularly following 1910's Liberal government policy for expansion of agriculture and establishment of the Development Fund, this financial burden on the councils diminished, falling to only £3,000 by 1925. Indeed, itinerant agriculture lecturer Hall left Rothamsted in 1912 to become one of eight commissioners to the Development Fund. The college would be able to seek annual grants from successive central government agriculture or education departments by presenting itself alternately as an agricultural institution or university respectively.

1895	Cottages on Wye High Street, between the college and Olantigh Road, purchased. Initially for student accommodation but later demolished to make way for a main entrance.

The South Eastern Agricultural College at Wye immediately took advantage of the University of London Act 1898 and became one of its federated schools with such privileges as it would have had if situated within the administrative county of London. Even in formal documents it was also referred to as Wye College at the time. From 1894, students seeking a three-year qualification completed the college's two-year diploma and were then prepared a further year for examination by the Royal Agricultural Society of England, the Surveyors' Institution or by Cambridge University. The arrangement was reversed for the new London University Bachelor of Science degree. Students could take first year basic science courses anywhere in the university's Faculty of Science and the latter years provided specialist teaching such as agricultural chemistry, agricultural botany and agricultural engineering.

1901	Architect Thomas Collcutt, noted for the Savoy Hotel and Palace Theatre, had prepared designs that would complete the college facing onto Wye High Street. Unlike his dramatic earlier work these buildings drew from Arts and Crafts themes incorporating traditional materials.
1901	West quadrangle built out to the college boundary, including a lecture hall (Lecture Room B); botany and zoology rooms; museum; drawing office and common room. A new chemistry wing (Lecture Room C) constructed to the north east and 30 student rooms provided on the first floor.

Alfred Daniel Hall removed to Rothamsted in 1902 to continue his marriage of agriculture and science. At Wye he was replaced as principal by his Oxford contemporary Malcolm Dunstan, formerly director of the Midland Agricultural and Dairy Institute.

Hall's departure was promptly followed by opening botany lecturer and vice-principal John Percival who moved to the University of Reading and became founding father of the faculty of agriculture there. Seeds Percival took with him formed the nucleus of a native European wheat variety collection eventually numbering over 2,500 varieties in the 1930s.

John Russell had joined the college in 1901 and took over chemistry teaching from Henry Cousins. Russell began research into soil microbiology determining that oxygen uptake could be used to measure micro-organism activity in a soil sample. However, he too departed in 1907 taking up an invitation to rejoin Hall at Rothamstead. In 1968, Wye College's Russell Laboratories were named for him.

In 1903, the college appointed C S Orwin its lecturer in farm management and book-keeping. At opening he had been the first potential student interviewed by Hall and went on to be treasurer of the college's students' union in its first year. Orwin remained on staff for three years and was later appointed by Hall to lead the Department of Agricultural Economics created at Oxford. Academics at Wye sought early ways to establish the actual cost of agricultural products on farm, albeit with varied success, and double entry book-keeping was then a part of the curriculum.

1904	Workshops for practical instruction (latterly parts of the maintenance and housekeeping department) constructed along Olantigh Road to the north east of existing buildings.
1906	Construction of north and south quadrangles with gymnasium on the later dining hall site. The enclosure comprised research laboratories; offices (Agriculture Department), and student rooms on the first floor.
1912	North, and part of the east, to what would become the front quadrangle, constructed incorporating research laboratory and student space.

In 1913, East Malling and Wye Fruit Experimental Station established on 22 acres (8.9 ha) bought by Kent County Council at East Malling. It was under the college's control and initially advised by botanist V H Blackman of Imperial College. Ronald Hatton was appointed director of the station in 1914 and remained in post for the rest of his career. Hatton prioritised basic research; was concerned about the conditions of horticultural workers like fellow socialist Hall, and merely tolerated requests for practical advice from growers. The station became independent of the college in 1921.

1914	Gateway and porters' lodge constructed completing the college's front quadrangle.

The 1894 premises included chemical and biological laboratories. By 1901 expansion meant rooms could be dedicated to a drawing office as well as botany, zoology and analytical laboratories. With completion of works in 1914, space would be made available to support study of agriculture, horticulture, entomology, mycology, dairying, engineering, economics and physics. There was an iron workshop / forge and accommodation for operational research.

During World War I, student numbers shrank as students enlisted. A 28 bed reception hospital operated from 1915 to 1916 and subsequently a Red Cross supply depot was organised by Mrs Barnard of Withersdane Hall and principal Dunstan's daughter Hester. The War Office presented the college with a German field gun in gratitude.

Malcolm Dunstan left Wye in 1922 to lead the Royal Agricultural College. He was replaced by Robert Wilson, formerly principal of the East Anglian Institute of Agriculture.

1924	Southern Table Poultry Research Station opened by the National Poultry Institute, with funding from Government and British Poultry Council. Initial research was on suitable nutrition for the birds. The college was already engaged in egg-laying competitions for ducks.
1925	Pig research unit established. Until this time pig production, along with the rearing of poultry or rabbits, bee-keeping and even production of pigeons for meat, was considered part of horticulture.
1925	Row of Houses (Squires) to north of the college on Olantigh Road purchased. They had been built in 1905.
1925	Taper of land north of the college to the Occupation Road crossroads purchased from Erle-Drax family as a part of their disposal of Wye Court and other Olantigh Estate property. Initially the space was used as garden, but would be developed as laboratories and the New Lecture Theatre.

Lord Northbourne joined the college's board of governors in 1925. He was also on the board of future merger partner Swanley Horticultural College and remained a governor of Wye College until 1965.

1927	Amage, Coldharbour and Silks Farm purchased, again likely from the Erle-Drax family.
1935	Guinness Laboratories constructed, north of the main college buildings, for the Hop Research Department. Works were funded by the eponymous brewing company and opened by the Earl of Iveagh in 1936. The vaguely Arts and Crafts design was considered old fashioned at the time, particularly for a scientific research building isolated from the original college's medieval fabric.

Ahead of war in 1939, Betteshanger Summer School visited the college farm. Lord Northbourne, originator of the term organic farming, hosted a biodynamic agriculture study week and was governor of the college.

During World War II the college initially remained open, alongside providing training to the Women's Land Army, but closed in autumn 1940, its accommodation requisitioned for 180 Land Army recruits. Remaining students and faculty transferred to the University of Reading but principal Robert Wilson died in September 1940. Military Southern Command used some of the buildings. General Montgomery, Corps Commander for the South East, was a frequent visitor, briefing troops in the Old Lecture Theatre and Latin School. The college dining hall (Wheelroom) provided a space for servicemen's Catholic Mass, the first time it had been celebrated in the village of Wye since the Reformation.

With the end of hostilities Withersdane Hall was purchased for £10,000 from Florence Barnard to house students of Swanley Horticultural College. Initially they lived in the house, and temporary buildings erected on its grounds. Botanist Norah Lillian Penston joined the South Eastern Agricultural College, ahead of its merger with Swanley College, as first female vice-principal. She went on to lead Wye's Department of Biological Science until 1951.

Former World War II RAF Wing Commander Dunstan Skilbeck was appointed principal at the end of the war. A "forceful character", he remained in post for 23 years modelling Wye on an Oxford college, establishing and reinforcing traditions such as formal dining and the wearing of academic gowns. He took particular interest in forming the college's archeological society and beagle pack.

Skilbeck was joined by Louis Wain, returning to Wye as head of the two person chemistry department. He had previously been a temporary lecturer between 1937 and 1939. Wain went on to be head of Wye's ARC Plant Growth Substances and Systemic Fungicides Unit, and contributed to agricultural chemistry research at the college for fifty years. While at Wye he developed and patented early synthetic auxin selective herbicides 2,4-DB, MCPB, Bromoxynil and Ioxynil. Wain was widely regarded as "Wye's unofficial chief scientist" and "ambassador" responsible for much of the college's reputation. His work there also created herbicide Mecoprop, fungicides Captan and Wyerone, as well as innovative plant growth regulators and insecticides.

1947	Construction of premises for the National Agricultural Advisory Service at the north-west corner of the estate, along Olantigh Road. The service took over agricultural extension tasks the college had performed for the south-east of England, albeit co-located and in close co-operation.

In 1947, the South Eastern Agricultural College formally amalgamated with Swanley Horticultural College as the School of Agriculture and Horticulture within the University of London. Swanley College's former premises had been heavily damaged during World War II and it was decided to rebuild at a combined college rather than in Swanley.

Principals of the South Eastern Agricultural College
Alfred Daniel Hall	1894–1902
Malcolm Dunstan	1902–1922
Robert Wilson	1922–1940
Dunstan Skilbeck	1945–1948

=== Wye College ===
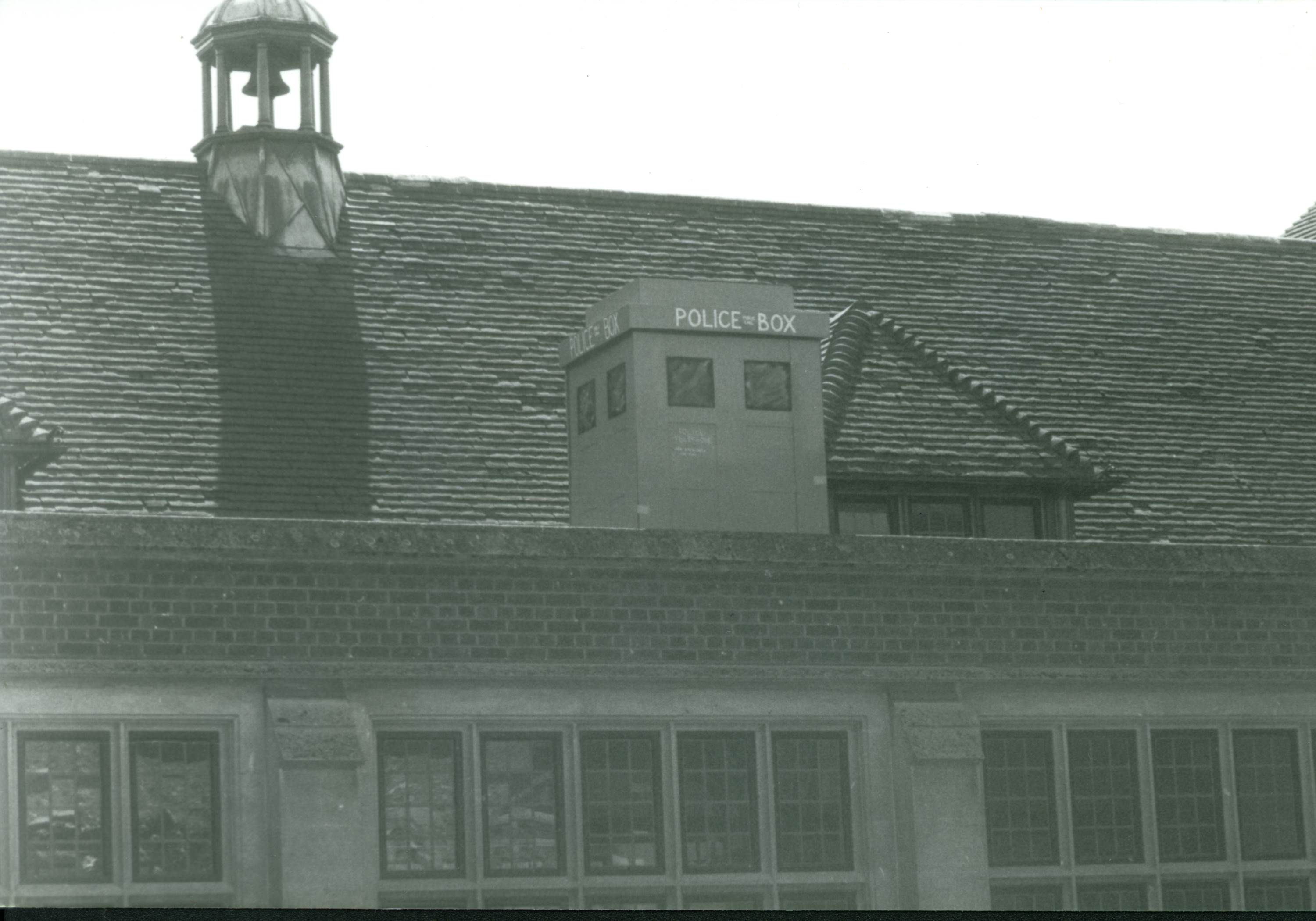
Dining Hall with bell, 1984

On 13 September 1948 Wye College was incorporated, by royal charter of King George VI, a full institution of the University of London as The College of St Gregory and St Martin at Wye generally known as "Wye College". Its objects included:-

...providing for persons of both sexes instruction and means of research in all or any of the subjects relating to the practice and science of agriculture and horticulture comprised in the Faculty of Science of the University of London and in such other subjects of or cognate to a University Education in Agriculture and Horticulture as may be decided upon from time to time by the Governing Body of Wye College.

— Imperial College Act 1999

The major impact for the college was a cessation of short and diploma courses in favour of entirely degree-level education, which occurred alongside transfer of its agricultural extension work to the newly formed National Agricultural Advisory Service. Over the next 20 years the institution was to transform itself from a local agricultural college that "happened to have a network of international contacts" to a truly "national and international" establishment combining the "practical and academic".

1948	Three storey student accommodation block incorporating warden's flat constructed at Withersdane Hall. This was to be a nucleus for the country's first purpose built post-war university hall of residence.

In 1951, a room behind the college's Jacobean staircase north west of the cloister was converted to a chapel and consecrated by Geoffrey Fisher, Archbishop of Canterbury. Paintings to be hung on the walls were provided by principal Dunstan Skilbeck's father and pews salvaged from the collapsed Eastwell Church. It had been a toilet before earlier transformation to small laboratory. There has been speculation this room was originally the chantry's library.

The refurbishment featured a stained glass window designed by Michael Farrar-Bell, looking onto Wye Church, incorporating the University of London coat of arms, and depictions of King Henry VI and Cardinal Kempe.

The chapel was reconsecrated in 1997, and under 2021's planning permission is to be "available for public worship for four services per month and an annual heritage open day".

1952	National Fruit Collection established at Brogdale with Wye College as the scientific partner. In spite of Government proposals to close Brogdale ADAS in 1989 and move the collection to Wye as of 2015, the collection remains at Brogdale managed by the Department for Environment, Food and Rural Affairs, and University of Reading.
1954	Gymnasium demolished and replaced by (or converted to) a dining hall incorporating hammerbeam roof, and wood panelling designed by Lord Northbourne. The external brick and stone architecture is subtly different on each side to reflect the various buildings facing it.

In 1954, Gerald Wibberley was appointed head of the Department of Economics. He led a move to broaden the college's interest in land use and explored alternatives to a farming first philosophy, sometimes causing conflict with the national agricultural establishment and colleagues promoting Wye's agricultural chemistry tradition. With associate Robin Best who for the first time accurately measured urban land area and loss of farmland, Wibberley drew particular early ire in the garden controversy, an exploration of capacity for food security from productive modern farming; the role of domestic gardens, and the potential for releasing farmland to other purposes.

Alongside his roles at the Council for Small Industries in Rural Areas, and as expert witness to public inquiries into large scale planning applications, Wibberley continued at the college until 1985. His work led to expansion of social science research and teaching at Wye with new Rural Environmental Studies and Landscape Ecology, Design and Maintenance courses, and ultimately business management options.

1957	Court Lodge farm and manor house at Brook purchased for £20,500, adding 194 acres (79 ha) to the college estate. The house was refurbished as residence for the principal.
1961	Construction of single storey research and teaching laboratories, and New Lecture Theatre, alongside diagonal footpath at north of college.
1961	Agricultural Research Council Unit of Plant Nutrition and Morphogenesis moved to Wye College under Francis John Richards. It initially operated from the Guinness Laboratories before relocating to the purpose built Russell Laboratories in 1968.
1968	Harry Darling replaces Dunstan Skilbeck as principal. Darling was a committed Christian and had been Professor of Agriculture at Ahmadu Bello University in Nigeria. During his tenure the College's character changed substantially. Domestic students were joined by 200 from some 50 countries overseas.
1968	Russell Laboratories opened facing Olantigh Road north of the Occupation Road junction. Named for Sir John Russell.
	Undergraduate Rural Environment Studies course commenced, commonly known both by its acronym RES and alternative expansion "Real Easy Studies".

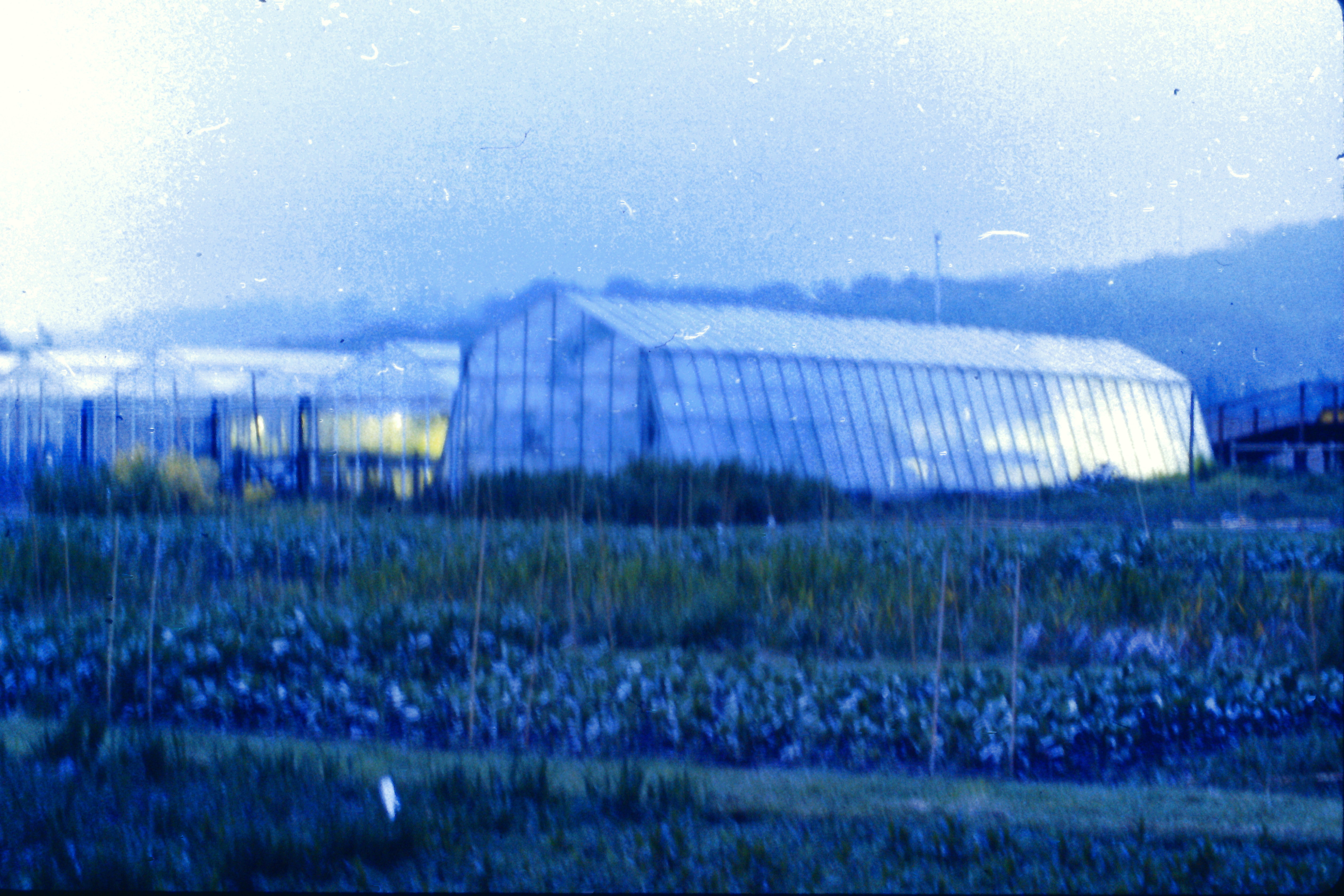
Wye College research greenhouses on Occupation Road, 1983

The Wye Double Digger was developed at Wye College in the 1970s, for experimental evaluation of comprehensive subsoil loosening akin to the traditional horticultural practise of double digging. It incorporates a conventional mouldboard plough with rotary cultivator operating in the open furrow, and can break up soil compaction layers below plough depth; mix topsoil with subsoil, and deeply incorporate soil nutrients. The powered blades help provide forward propulsion for the share. Wye's Double Digger was tested around the world, notably at Purdue University. A business was established to market it, and commercial two furrow version built, before development ceased.

1974	Students' union building opened.
1975	CEAS premises built at Withersdane Hall.

In 1977, the college appointed Ian Lucas as principal to replace Harry Darling. Darling's departure was marked by a farewell above Wye village, on the Crown slope painted in weedkiller for all to see across the Stour Valley. Lucas had extensive experience of overseas agriculture and arrived from the University College of North Wales where he had been Professor of Agriculture. During his 11 years at Wye student enrollment increased 40%.

During the early 1980s, Government spending cuts led to a series of mergers between University of London colleges. In spite of Wye being among the very smallest, and persistent concerns that agriculture was not "a fit subject to study at university", it was spared a merger because of physical isolation outside the capital and the absence of course overlap / potential cost savings with sister London colleges.

1986	Lloyds Bank hall of residence opened at Withersdane Hall.
	New Lecture Theatre expanded and renamed Carr Lecture Theatre for Stephen and Ann Carr who assisted the scheme.
1989	Wolfson Lecture Theatre completed.
1992	Dunstan Skilbeck Hall opened at Withersdane Hall named for the former principal, followed the next year by adjoining Bernard Sunley Hall / Garden Hall. The latter scheme was assisted by the Bernard Sunley Foundation and included larger, family accommodation for postgraduates.
1996	Principal's house, Court Lodge, sold for £300,000 as a private dwelling.

In 1996, Natural Resources International Ltd was incorporated in partnership with Imperial College, and the universities of Edinburgh and Greenwich, to take over overseas development training and consulting services formerly provided by the Government's Overseas Development Agency Natural Resources Institute. Turnover in the first year was £25.9 million rising to £26.8 million by the time of the college's merger with Imperial College. Clients included the Department for International Development, World Bank, European Union, African Development Bank, Asian Development Bank, and other state and commercial bodies.

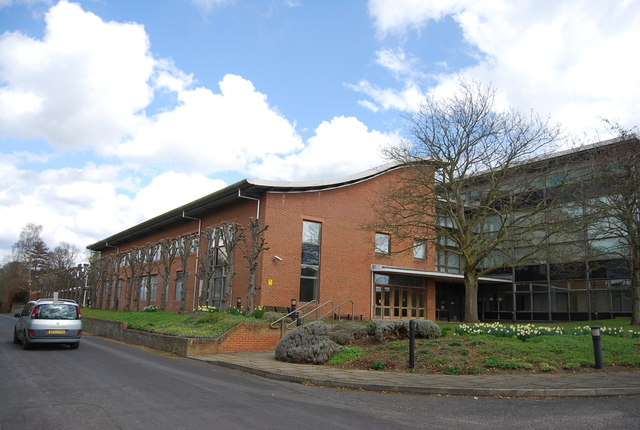
Kempe Centre, 2013

In 1997 the Kempe Centre, named for Cardinal John Kempe, was opened by Princess Anne at the junction of Olantigh and Occupation Roads. The learning resource building designed by Nicholas Hare Architects received a RIBA award, with praise for its aesthetic grandeur and environmental efficiency. It subsequently formed the nucleus of Wye School.

Of the £4 million projected cost only £750,000 came from the Higher Education Funding Council for England. The college provided £2 million from property sales (including Court Lodge); the Frank Parkinson Agricultural Trust donated £100,000, and £500,000 came from an appeal including sums from the Wolfson Foundation, Westminster foundations and individual alumni. The remainder was funded by commercial loans.

According to Imperial College's account of the "World Class Merger" in 2000, Wye College had students enrolled from 50 countries; 477 undergraduates; 259 postgraduates, and 200 on short courses. The growing External Programme had registered 975 mid-career professionals from 120 countries.

Principals of Wye College
Dunstan Skilbeck	1948–1968
Harry Darling	1968–1977
Ian Lucas	1977–1988
John Prescott	1988–2000

=== Imperial College at Wye ===
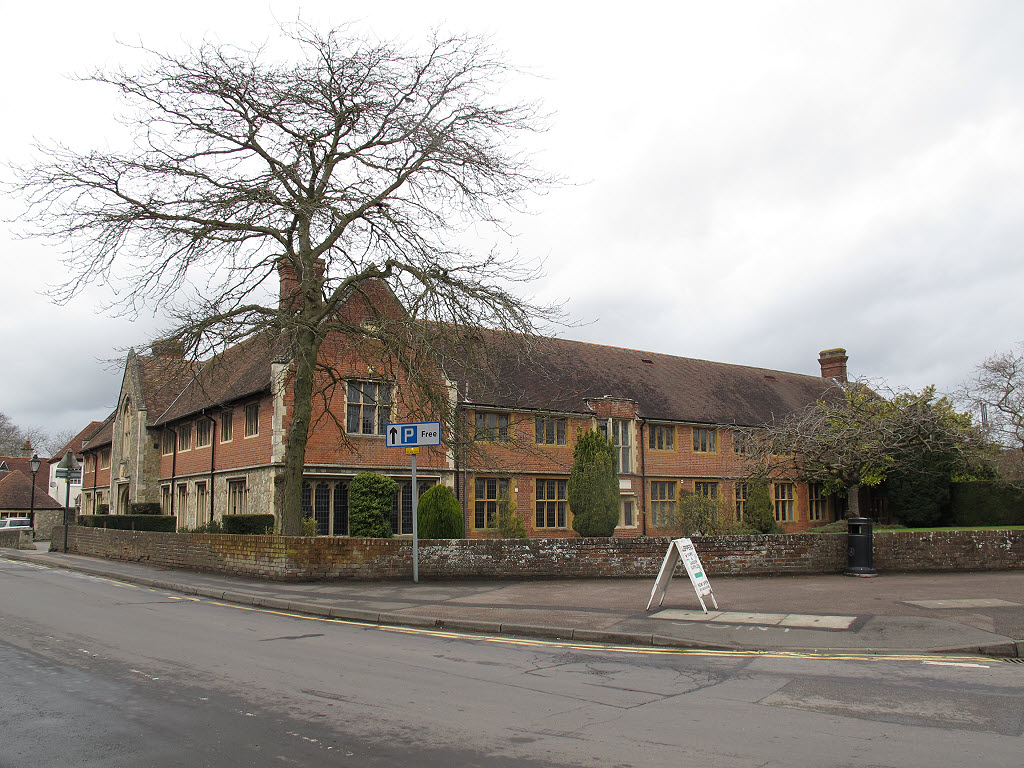
Former Wye College library, 2013

In 2000, Wye College merged with Imperial College and was renamed Imperial College at Wye. It ceased to be an independent College of London University.

Justifications for the merger from Wye College's side were largely an aspiration to achieve financial resilience through scale. There was anticipated decline in demand for domestic agricultural qualifications. Government intended to withdraw from funding near market agricultural research in favour of pure sciences; reduce per capita student payments generally; weight them away from the subjects taught at Wye, and move to annual rather than five yearly funding arrangements. The college governors felt these measures would disproportionately and adversely impact small agricultural teaching and research institutions like Wye.

Apart from Imperial College, mergers were considered with University of Kent at Canterbury and University of Greenwich. The governors concluded that Imperial College, like Wye a constituent College of the University of London, complemented Wye most closely. The colleges were already partners in Natural Resources International, though so too was Greenwich. Imperial College was publicly enthusiastic.

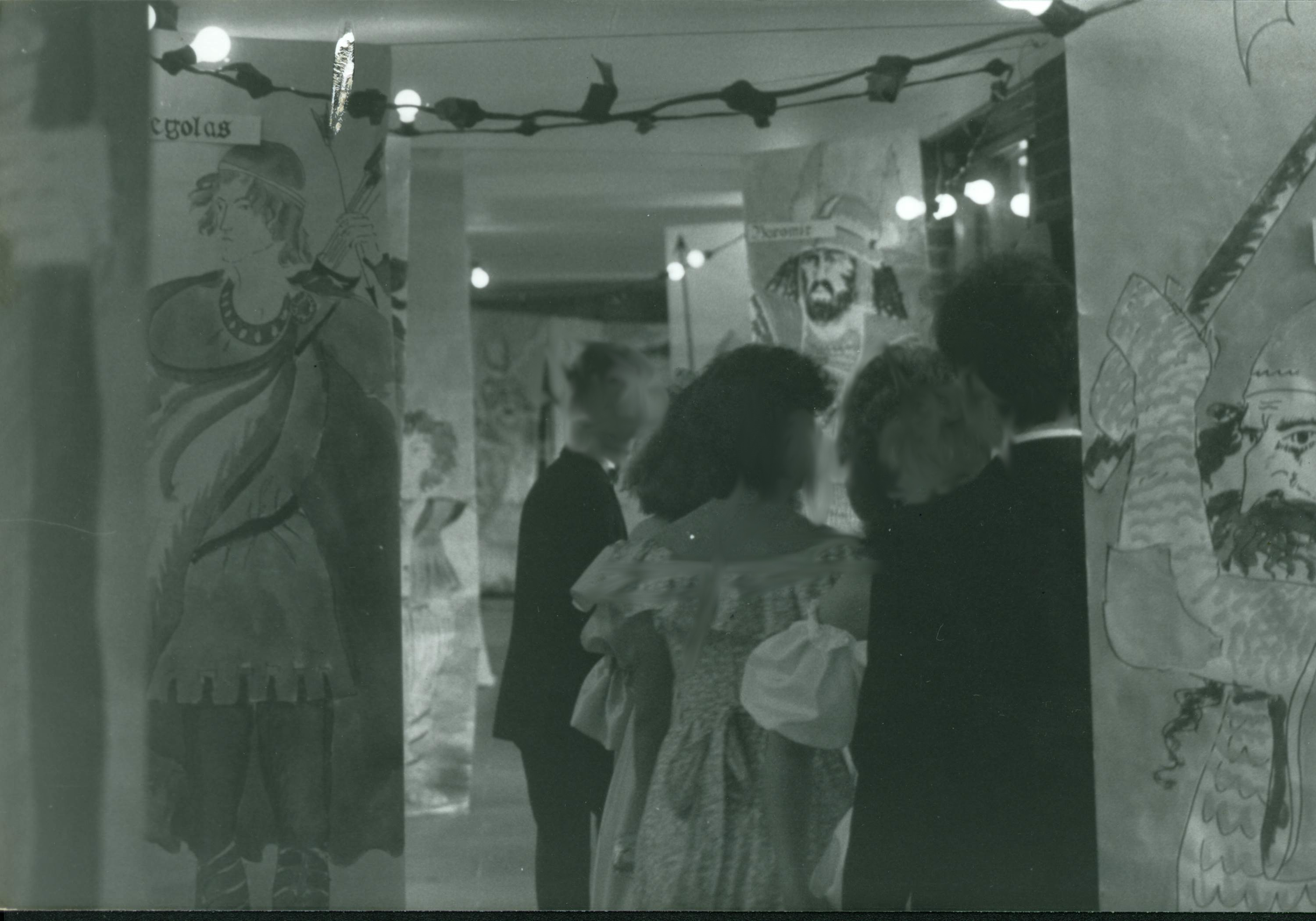
Commemoration Ball at Withersdane Hall, 1984

In spite of reporting an operating surplus only once in its last ten independent years, instead relying heavily on endowment income and property sales, Wye College went into the merger with net assets of £18.24 million. It had doubled annual revenue in those years to £12.65 million and pivoted away from a dependency on traditional agricultural science courses. The college had just invested £5.5 million in new facilities, and a further £2 million preparing 50 postgraduate courses for the External Programme.

Imperial College briefly used Wye College's origins to dubiously claim the status of third-oldest university in England.

Sir Richard Sykes was appointed new rector of Imperial College in 2000. He visited Wye and expressed enthusiasm for investment in academic facilities there, placing the campus in the short lived Life Sciences faculty that arose from his early reorganisation of Imperial College.

Nevertheless, 25% of academic staff at Wye were offered redundancy terms and took them. Worse still, Imperial College inadvertently did not include Wye undergraduate courses in its prospectus so admissions plummeted in 2000 and 2001.

As early as January 2001, Imperial College privately declared the 2000 merger a mistake and sought Higher Education Funding Council for England finance to transfer Wye campus to the University of Kent or a local technical college. As a result of these problems newly installed provost, Tim Clark resigned to be replaced by Jeff Waage. In public however, Imperial College began promoting Wye to potential students.

The Higher Education Funding Council did agree to meet legitimate costs Imperial College incurred in the 2000 merger. Imperial claimed £10.2 million. In 2002, the sum to be paid was settled at £2.5 million.

During a 2003 lecture to civil engineering students Sykes expressed concern about the integration of Wye College into Imperial College and stated it was not a part of his vision for Imperial College. By then student admissions to Wye were at record high levels, notably from EU residents on Agricultural Business Management courses, and research income was growing.

The campus met its first set of financial targets but was disadvantaged by Imperial College's policy to allocate property and occupancy costs at a flat rate across all its sites. Intensively used city centre premises in South Kensington were being charged the same rate per floor area as the many acres of glasshouses at Wye. In private, Imperial College rejected Wye's Department of Agricultural Science business plan for 2004 / 2005.

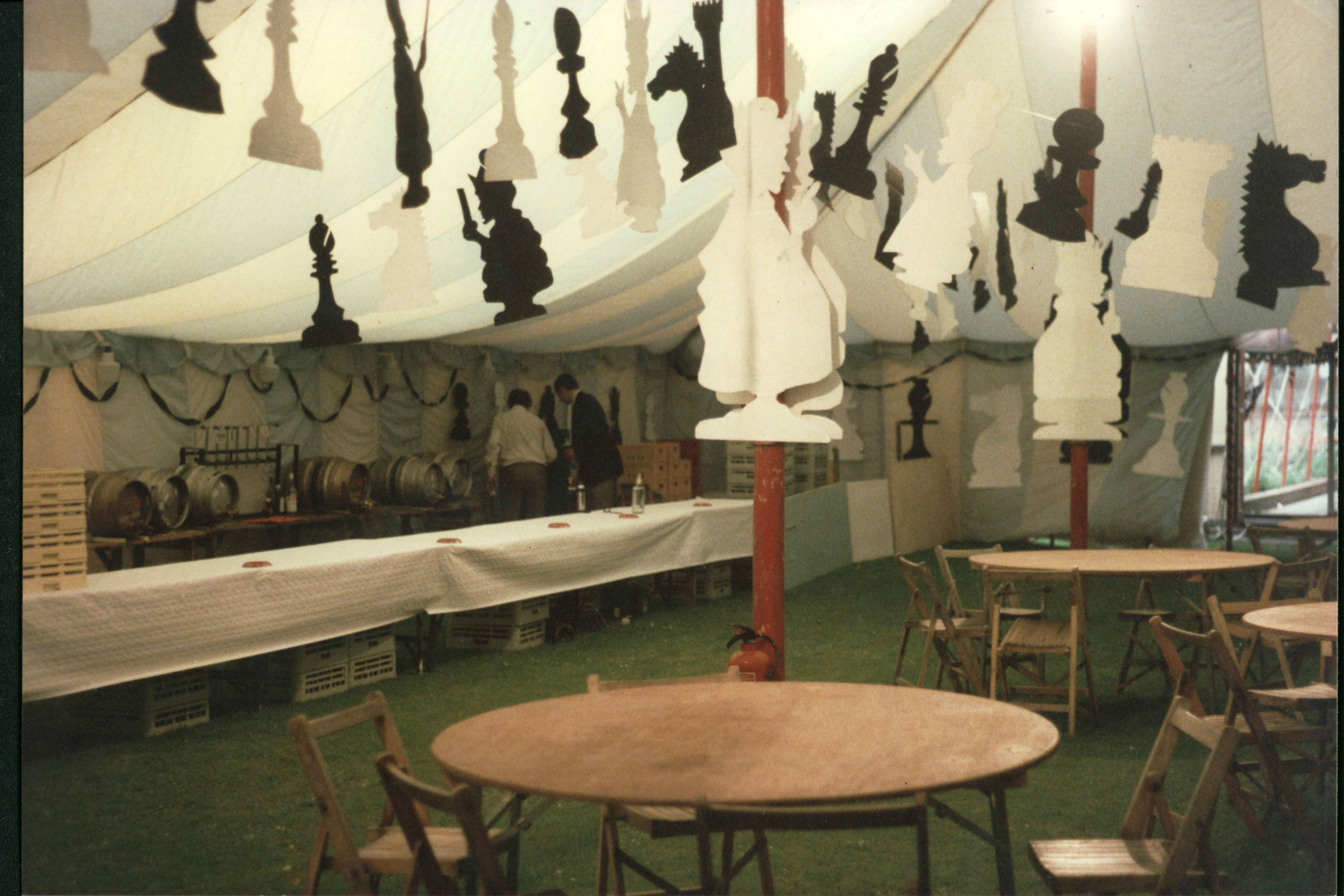
Commemoration Ball bar at Withersdane Hall, 1985

In 2004 Leszek Borysiewicz, Imperial College's deputy rector informed staff that Wye's Department of Agricultural Sciences was closing and most teaching and research at Wye would end. Provost, Jeff Waage protested then resigned. The sudden announcement was blamed on the department's financial performance; distance between Wye and London, and low academic grades among applicants for agriculture courses. Critics argued these were all matters well known to Imperial College before merger.

Provosts of Imperial College at Wye
Tim Clark	2000–2001
Jeff Waage	2001–2004

==== Imperial College scheme ====
In 2005, Imperial College announced it intended to convert Wye College's estate into a research centre for non-food crops and biomass fuels, and that it had support from Kent County Council and Ashford Borough Council. Later accounts included commercial biofuel production facilities on Wibberley Way and BP suggested as putative partner / operator. Leaked documents revealed Imperial College expected to gain £100 million by building 4,000 houses on 250 acres (100 ha) in the Kent Downs, provoking national as well as local opposition.

Imperial College's project team had spent at least £850,000 on external consultants preparing their Wye Park masterplan, and subsequently paid Bell Pottinger to lobby regional and national government in its favour.

The plan was seen as a test case for other attempts to build on Areas of Outstanding Natural Beauty. In 2006, Ashford Borough Council withdrew support, and Imperial College abandoned its plans. Campaigners hailed the decision as a key victory preserving the status of protected areas, and Wye as a village.

==== Closure ====
In 2007, the University of Kent ran undergraduate business management courses from Wye College though later transferred them to its main campus. The following year science staff relocated from Wye to Imperial College's South Kensington or Silwood Park sites and in 2009, the last students graduated and Wye College campus closed. Thereafter Imperial College sought to develop the estate, or to find suitable tenants for it.

The main village properties were sold to Telereal Trillium in 2015. Further sales included Squires Hostel as three dwellings; Wolfson Hostel as a site for six houses; the buildings opposite the college on High Street, and the pig, sheep and poultry (Agricultural Field Station / Farm Mechanisation Unit).

In 2021, Telereal Trillium obtained planning permission to convert the traditional college buildings to 38 dwellings. Conditions require public access one day a month to the cloistered quadrangle; Old lecture theatre; Old Hall; Parlour, and Jacobean staircase, and use of the Chapel for public worship. The former estates office area is reserved for charity, Wye Heritage. Imperial College's endowment fund retains ownership of the Wye College farmland.

== Estate and facilities ==
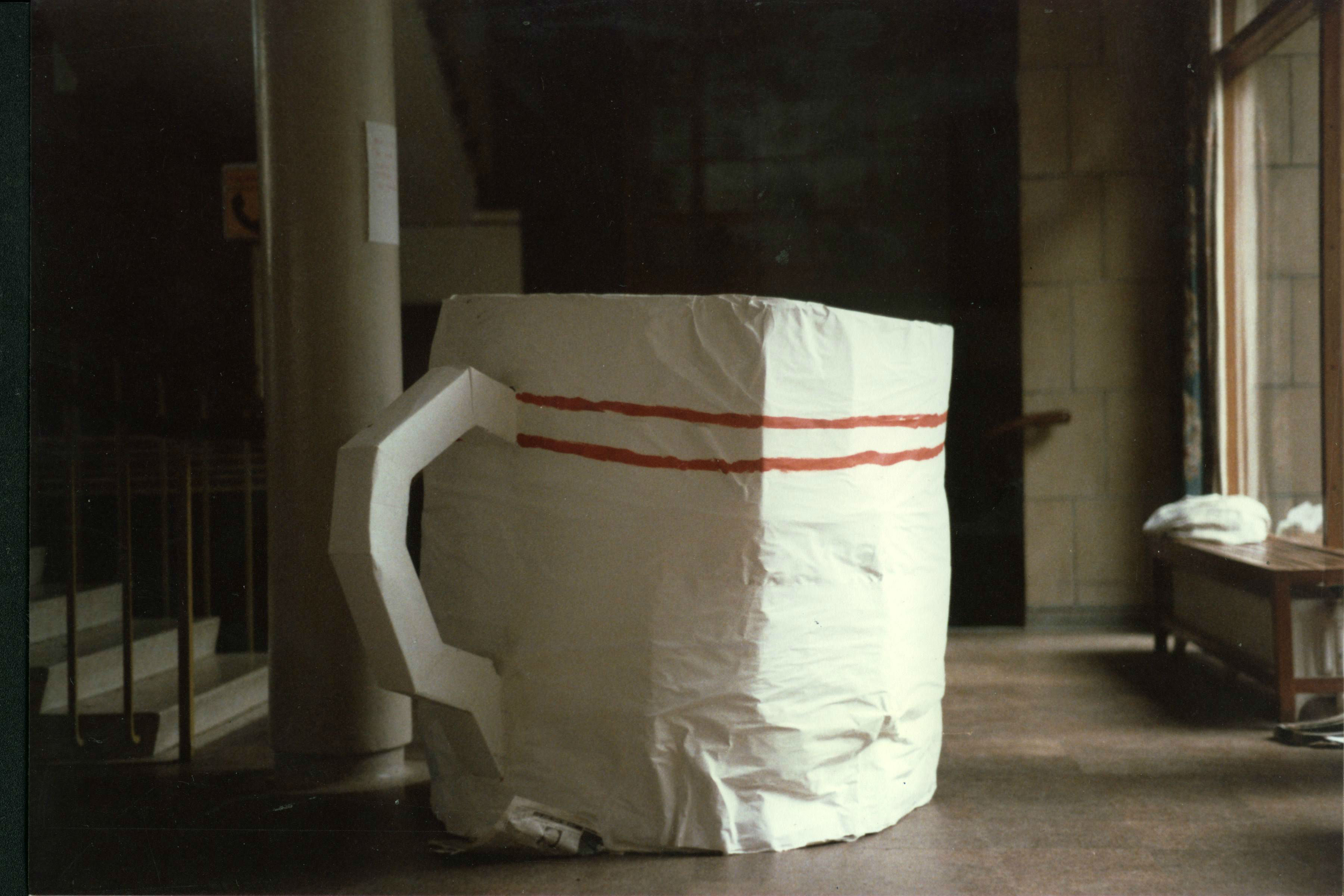
Mug decoration for Alice themed Commemoration Ball in Withersdane Hall foyer, 1985

Wye College's estate extended to about 390 hectares (960 acres), largely between the villages of Wye and Brook. The college farmed approximately 300 hectares (740 acres), and 25 hectares (62 acres) was employed for horticulture, both on a commercial basis. The remainder accommodated hop gardens, woodland, recreation space, research facilities and buildings.

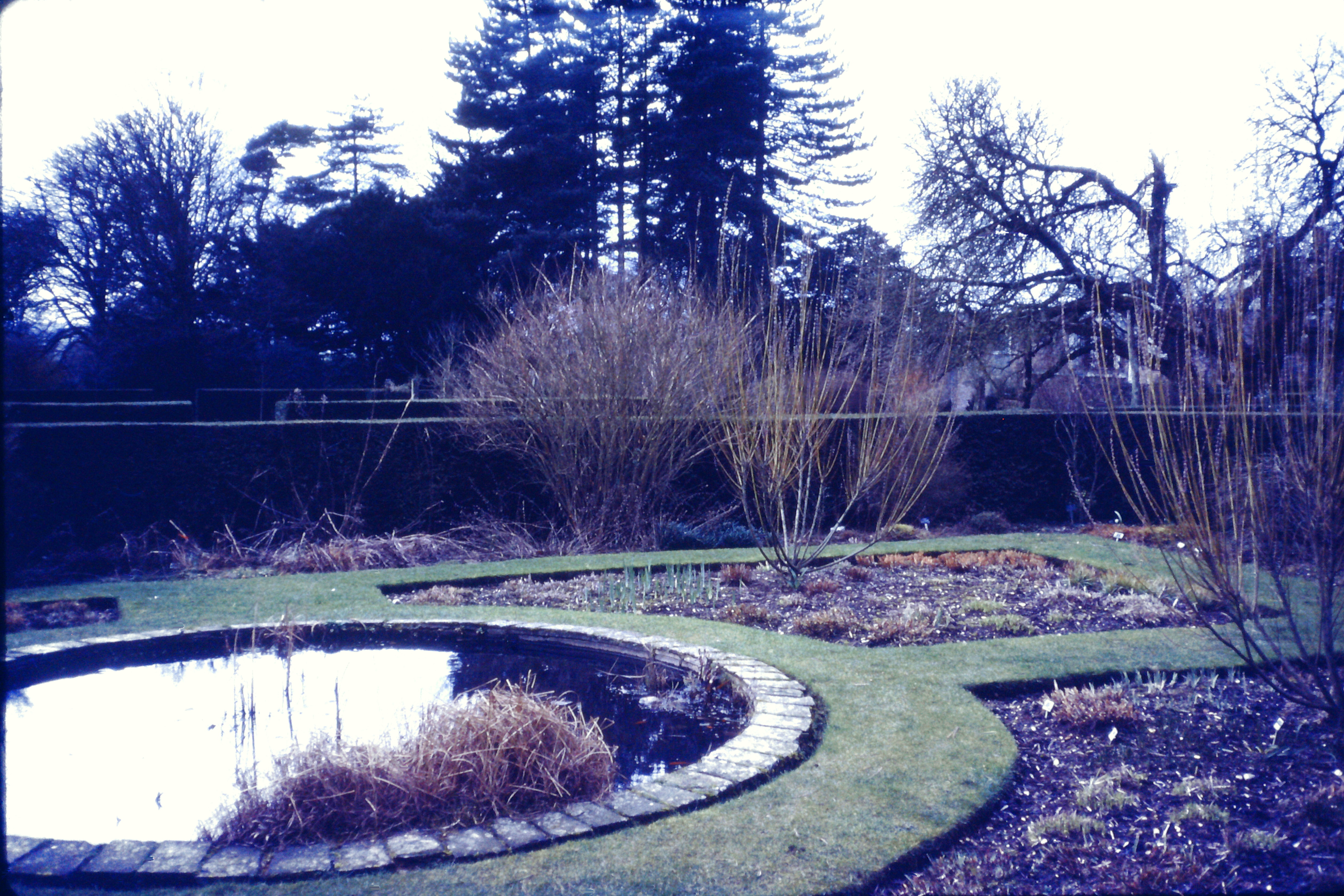
Withersdane gardens, 1983

By 1984, the college owned much of Wye village across the High Street from its main entrance, over to Bridge Street and some premises on Oxenturn Road. That was variously used for administration, student hostels, car parking, a clinic, laundry and offices. Outside the village Wye College owned the NIAB facility at Coldharbour Farm; the MAFF / Defra regional offices and laboratories on Olantigh Road; Regional Veterinary Investigation Centre / Edward Partridge House off Coldharbour Lane; Withersdane Hall, Agricultural Field Centre / Farm Mechanisation Unit / Poultry Research; beagle kennels; Court Lodge; Brook Agricultural Museum; sport fields on Cherry Garden Lane, and an SSSI site at Wye Crown and quarry.

By 2005, teaching and research resources included extensive glasshouses; climate-controlled growth rooms; a containment facility for transgenic plants; dedicated laboratories for plant molecular biology; genomics and gene sequencing; electron microscopy; use of radiochemicals; soil analysis, and plant/animal cell culture. Research was carried out at dairy, pig, hop and sheep enterprises on the college's farm; in the horticulture department; on the chalk grasslands, and among commercial crops.

=== Layout ===
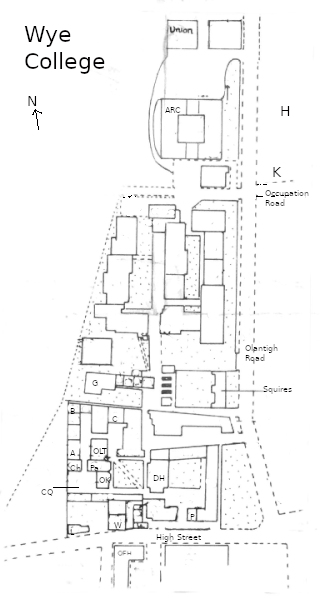
Ground floor layout plan of Wye College main campus 1982

- Union – Students' Union
- OH – Old Hall
- OLT – Old Lecture Theatre
- NLT – New Lecture Theatre
- Squires – Squires
- OFH – Old Flying Horse
- K – Site of Kempe Centre
- H – Hop Research
- P – Porters' Lodge / Entrance
- Pa – Parlour
- CQ – Cloister
- Ch – Chapel
- W – Wheelroom
- DH – Dining Hall
- A – Lecture Room A
- B – Lecture Room B
- C – Lecture Room C
- G – Guinness Laboratory
- ARC – ARC
- L – Latin School

=== Student accommodation ===
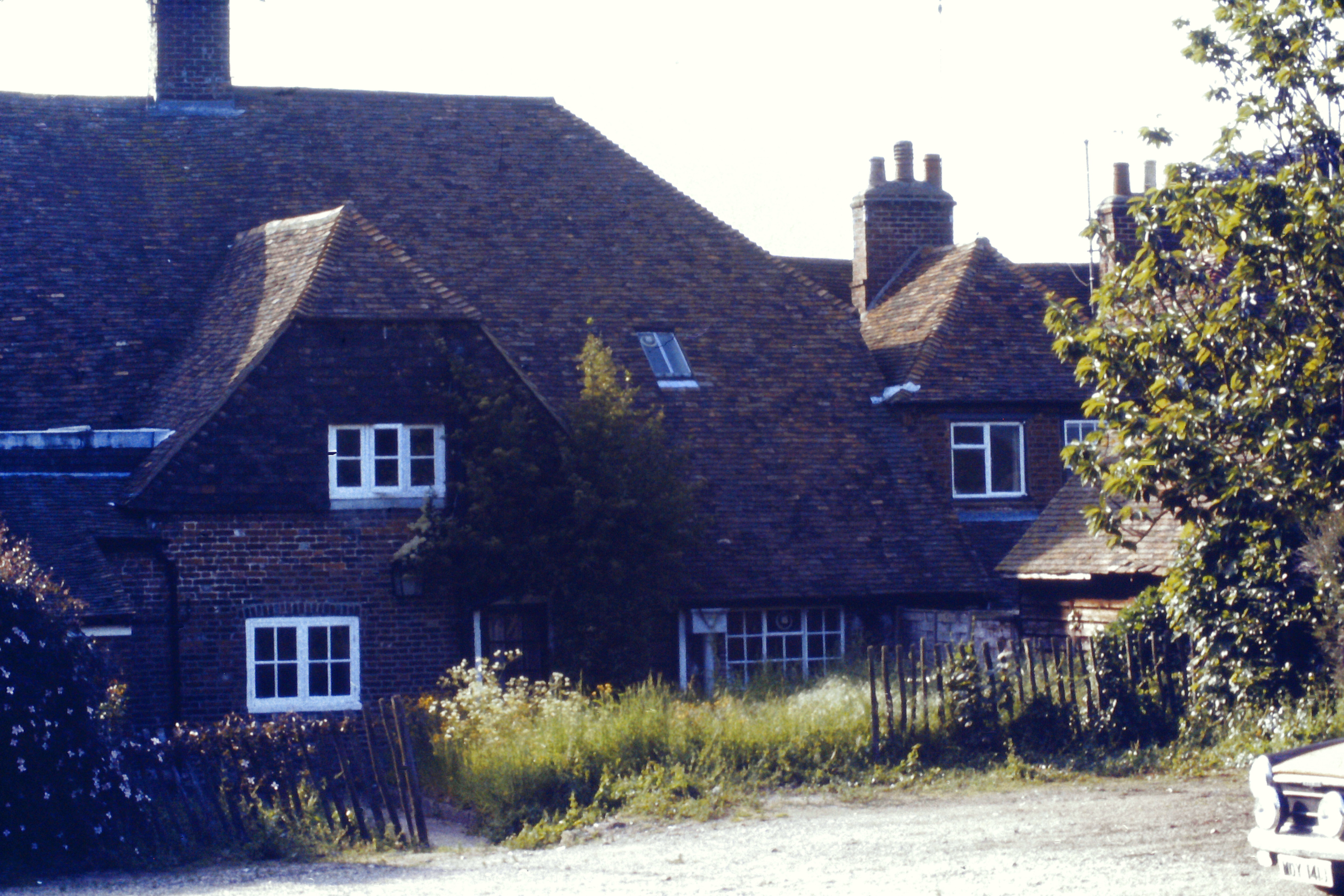
Daniel Hall Hostel, 1983

Student bedrooms were provided at Withersdane Hall, or on the first floor of the main campus above teaching and administration space. Alternatively, the college owned student hostels in Wye village. Some of the hostels were self catering. Other student accommodation was available in college and privately owned houses.

=== Old Flying Horse ===
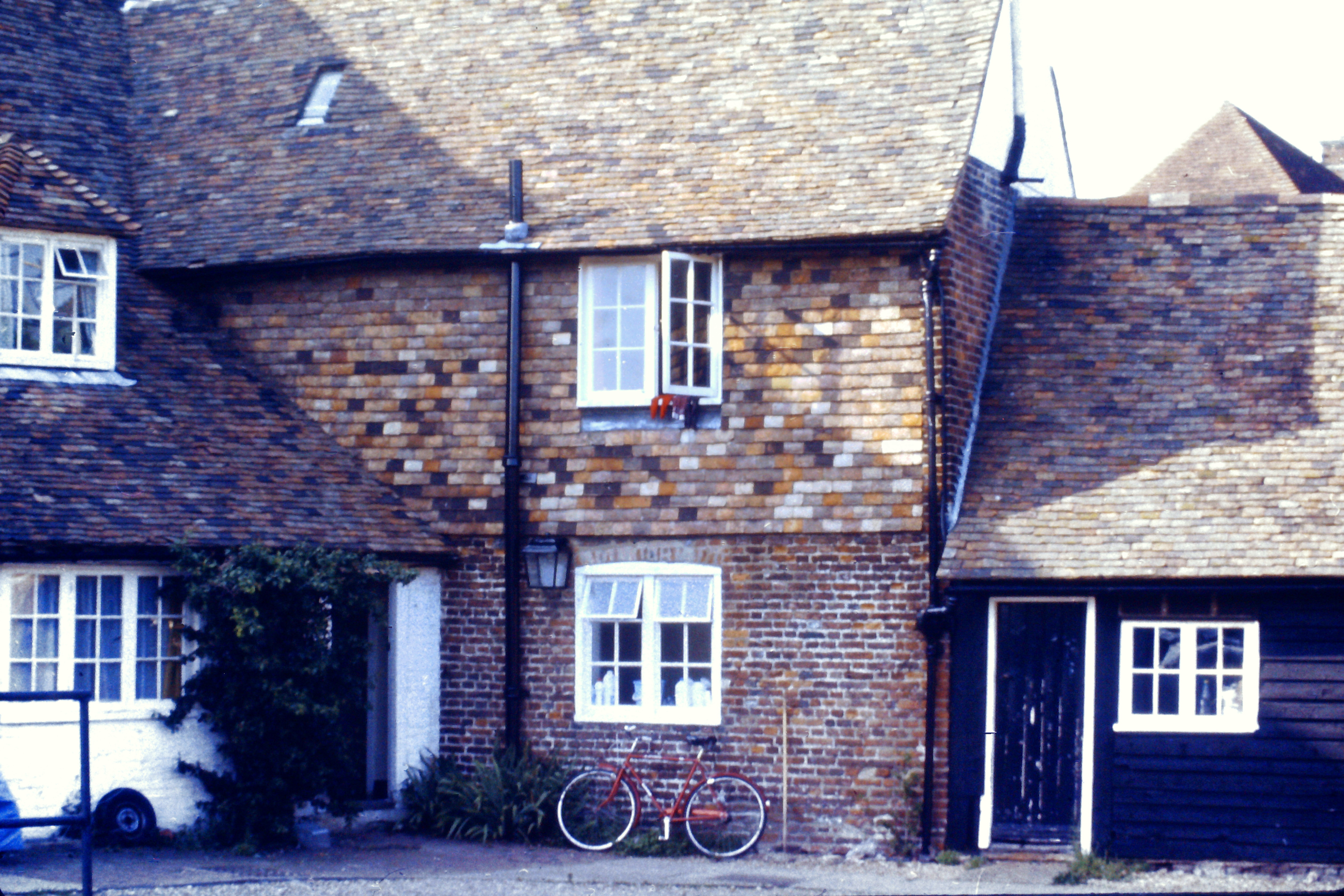
Old Flying Horse student accommodation, 1983

The hostel directly facing the main college entrance across High Street had been an inn, and before that medieval hall-house. Fourteenth century painted decoration and a dais canopy to protect guests from falling soot and sparks survived into the 20th century.

Student hostel, sometime house and Inn. Late C14 altered C16, clad C18. Timber framed and clad with painted brick and painted tile hanging on 1st floor. Plain tiled roof. Two storeys, basement and garret, with plinth, continuous moulded bressumer, the ground floor recessed to right 3 bays with jetty on brackets. Moulded wooden eaves cornice to hipped roof, with stacks to centre left and to right, and hipped dormer to left return. Five glazing bar sashes on 1st floor, and 2 to left on ground floor, with 3 wooden casements to right. Central door of 4 panels and 3 steps, and panelled door to right with 2 steps. Basement openings to centre. Left return (to High Street) with roof stepped down to rear range with stack at end left. Wooden casement and glazing bar sash on 1st floor, 3 wooden casements on ground floor. Panelled corner door with pilastered surround and flat hood. Single storey weather boarded block at extreme left (eastern end), with half-hipped plain tiled roof and half-doors in gable end. Catslide outshot and 2 hipped wings to rear. Interior: extremely rare survival of coved dais canopy, with evidence of colouring, unaltered when open hall floored C16. Crown post roof.

— Historic England Grade II* listed

=== Cloister ===
College. Founded 1432, occupied by 1448. Founded by Cardinal Archbishop John Kempe. Altered 1739. Timber framed on flint base and clad with red brick, and structural flint and red brick. Plain tiled roofs. The original college consisted of this cloister (domestic ranges and great hall) and detached school house and service building, such as the surviving brewhouse. South (Old Entrance) front flint ground floor with string course to red brick upper storey with hipped roof, with stacks to centre left and centre right. Five glazing bar sashes on 1st floor, C15 Perpendicular cusped lights on ground floor, 1 pair, 1 triple and 4 single. Central panelled door in pedimented porch with barley sugar columns with bobbin-like capitals (the tomb of Lady Joanna Thornhill in Wye College [sic] (Note: Should refer to Wye Church not college) also has barley sugar columns – she refounded a school in the college 1708). Left return (to churchyard) roughcast on ground floor with 3 light cusped windows to left and to right, with central arched doorway to cloister garth. Glazing bar sashes on brick 1st floor. Other exterior faces now within early C20 quadrangles, that immediately to east showing the moulded arched doorway through to the cloister, with mullioned square headed window over, and the Hall with 2 four-centred arched mullioned windows of the C15, and full height canted bay with 3 tier mullioned and transomed lights, the bay part of early C20 work. Cloister garth: the east wall with 2 depressed arched windows to Hall with brick stack projecting between them (truncated shaft). Originally fully framed, the arcade and gallery over rebuilt 1739 in red brick in English bond, with simple arcaded ground floor, plat band and boxed eaves, with glazing bar sashes on 1st floor. Within the inner wall the original, and fine, moulded C15 doorways survive, with C17 and earlier doors, C15 in some cases? Particularly good the wave moulded doorway with plank and stud door to the staircase.

— Historic England, Grade I listed

=== Painted glass ===
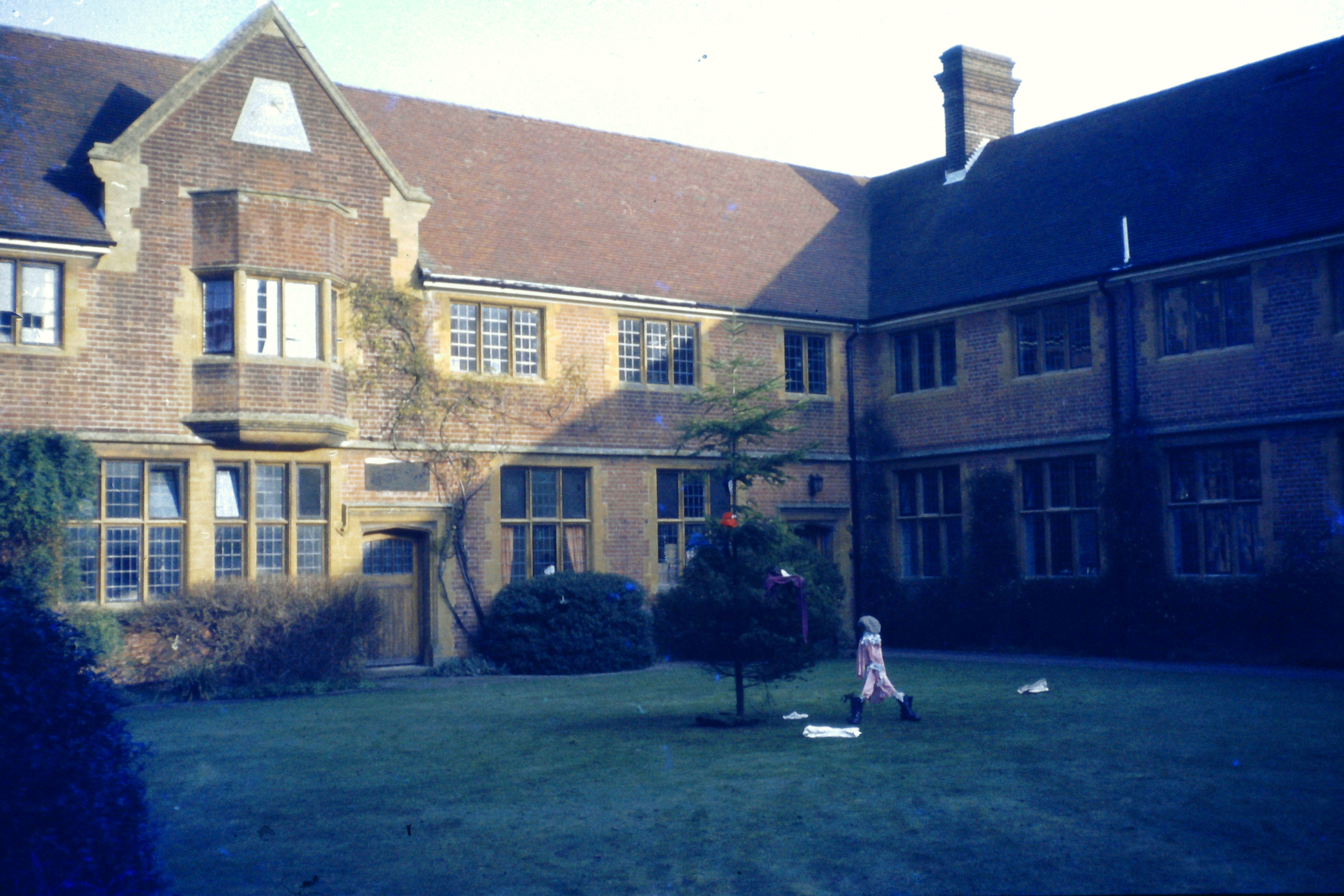
Wye College main quadrangle, Christmas 1983

In about 1996, it was discovered the low ground floor window from the college's cloistered quadrangle to Wye Churchyard was medieval painted glass and bore the crest of both's founder, Cardinal Kempe. The window was in a precarious position by the publicly accessible churchyard on the one side, and in a space used for student parties and ball games on the other. The college decided to replace it with a modern replica and sell the original. York Minster purchased the medieval glass at auction and incorporated it in their new Zouche Chapel, with other glasswork relating to Kempe.

=== Latin School ===
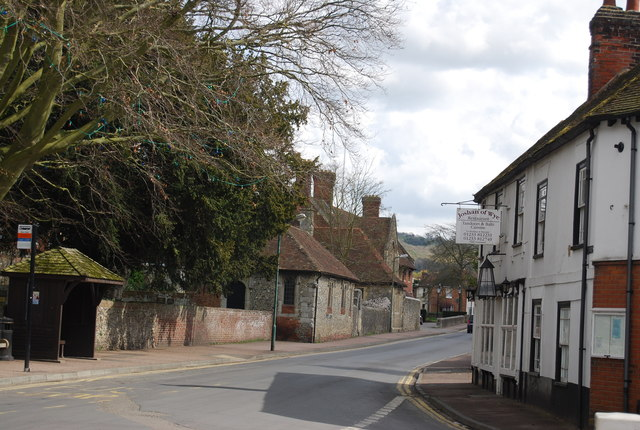
Latin School from Church Street, 2012

Schoolroom. Circa 1445 for Cardinal Archbishop John Kempe. Flint, in part refaced with red brick. Plain tiled roof. Single storey with hipped roof, and with 2 paired and 1 single four centred arched and label-hooded lights to road front, boarded door to left return with cusped light, both with label heads, and moulded doorway to right return. Wooden casements (in outshot) to north side. Interior: fireplace similar to that in the Parlour, Old Wye College; four centred ovolo moulded with fernleaf spandrels, with refined florid strapwork overmantel. Ogee headed panelled wall cupboards below the central window to south. Probably originally twice the size to north (hence the brick rebuilding). Built as, and used even after Dissolution, the Grammar School for both Kempe's original College and the Grammar School which succeeded it.

— Historic England, Grade I listed

The building may not have consistently been used as a schoolroom. As early as the 16th century, references suggest it was employed as a chapel. In 1903, a brick extension was added to accommodate a billiard table. The existing jacobean fireplace was moved and incorporated into the new structure.

During WWII the building, along with the college's Old Lecture Theatre, was used for briefings by General Montgomery.

Following college closure the Latin School was briefly occupied by community group Wye Heritage, as an exhibition and event space, but in 2021 Telereal Trillium obtained planning permission for conversion to residential use.

=== Old Hall ===
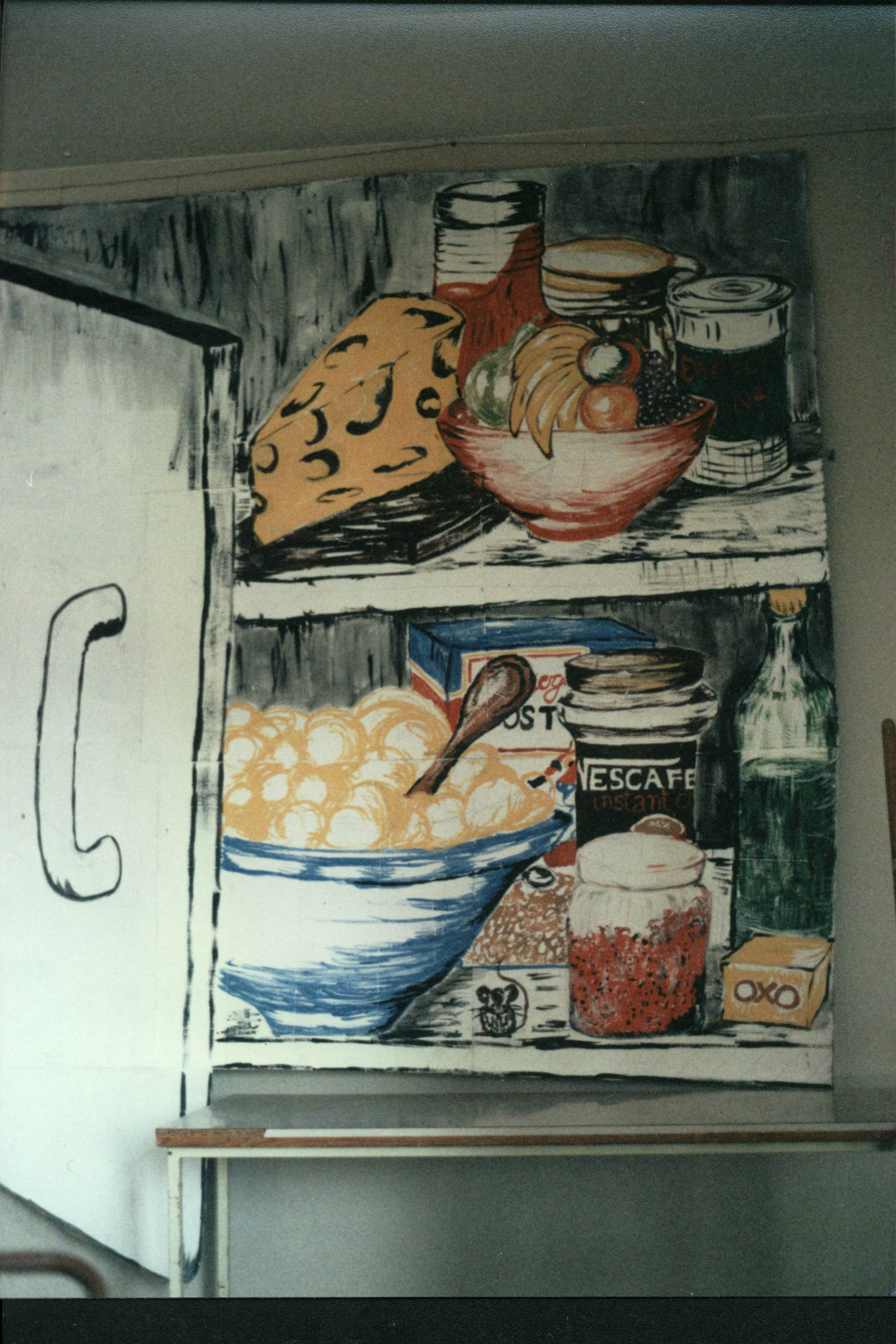
Student Commemoration Ball decorations at Withersdane Hall themed for Alice in Wonderland, 1985

Hall: renewed screen passage at southern end, with C15 four centred arched doorways. Four centred arched stone fireplace with fireback dated 1610, possibly the date also of the wainscoting with fluted pilasters and cornice. Crenellated dais beam. Tall octagonal crown posts on moulded tie beams. Fragments of stained glass (Kempe's Arms) in bay window.

— Historic England, Grade I listed

The minstrels' gallery is a 1946 embellishment, opposite the dais end of the hall.

=== Parlour ===
Parlour (later library): to north of Hall, entered also via cloister by linenfold panelled door in fluted surround to Ante room, with painted wainscoting. Parlour with heavily enriched panelling with foliated and scrolled pilasters, grotesque heads on bifurcated frieze with dragon motifs. Heavily carved and enriched beams. Stone fireplace carved in same manner as panelling with linenfold panel overmantel Structurally C15, decoratively late C16, the bay window and bookshelves c. 1900 (and 1980).

— Historic England, Grade I listed

To the left of the parlour's cloister entrance is the door to what was as of 2021, a large medieval wine cellar.

=== Withersdane Hall ===
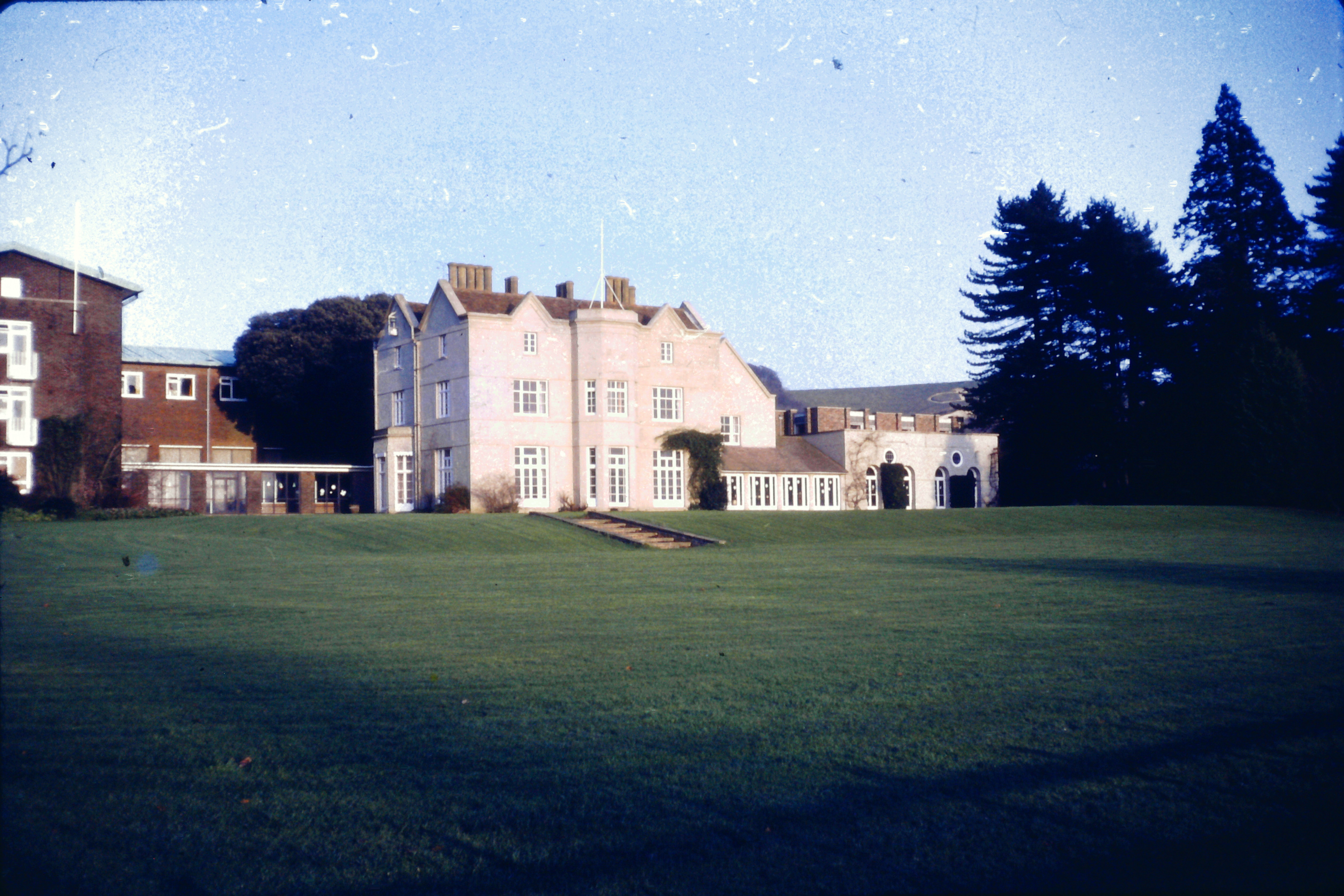
Withersdane Hall, 1983

51.18015°N 0.94764°E

Wye's College's Withersdane Hall was the country's first, post war, purpose built hall of residence though constructed around a pre-existing mansion. It included Swanley Hall auditorium; facilities for breakfast catering; lounges; laundry; formal gardens; tennis courts; woodland car parking; extensive lawns, and could be configured as a residential conference centre. CEAS operated from premises on the site. Between 1986 and 1993 Lloyds Bank, Dunstan Skilbeck and Bernard Sunley halls of residence were added to the complex.

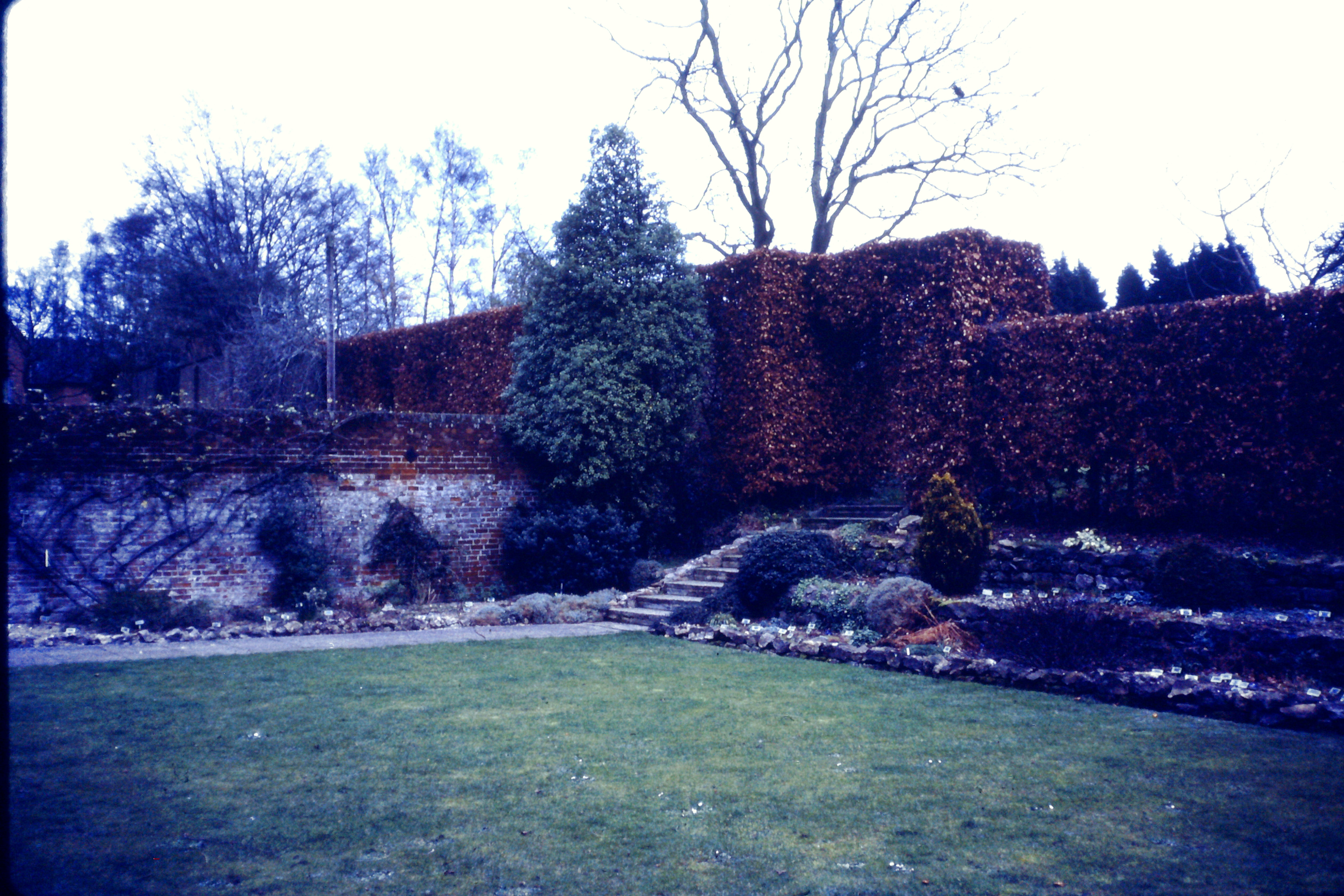
Withersdane Hall walled garden, 1983

The name Withersdane derives from Wider's Farmstead, being Widres tun in Old English. Tun became corrupted to don, den and then finally to the present name. In the 18th century, Hasted described Withersden as a hamlet, formerly a manor, "full of small inclosures, and the soil deeper".

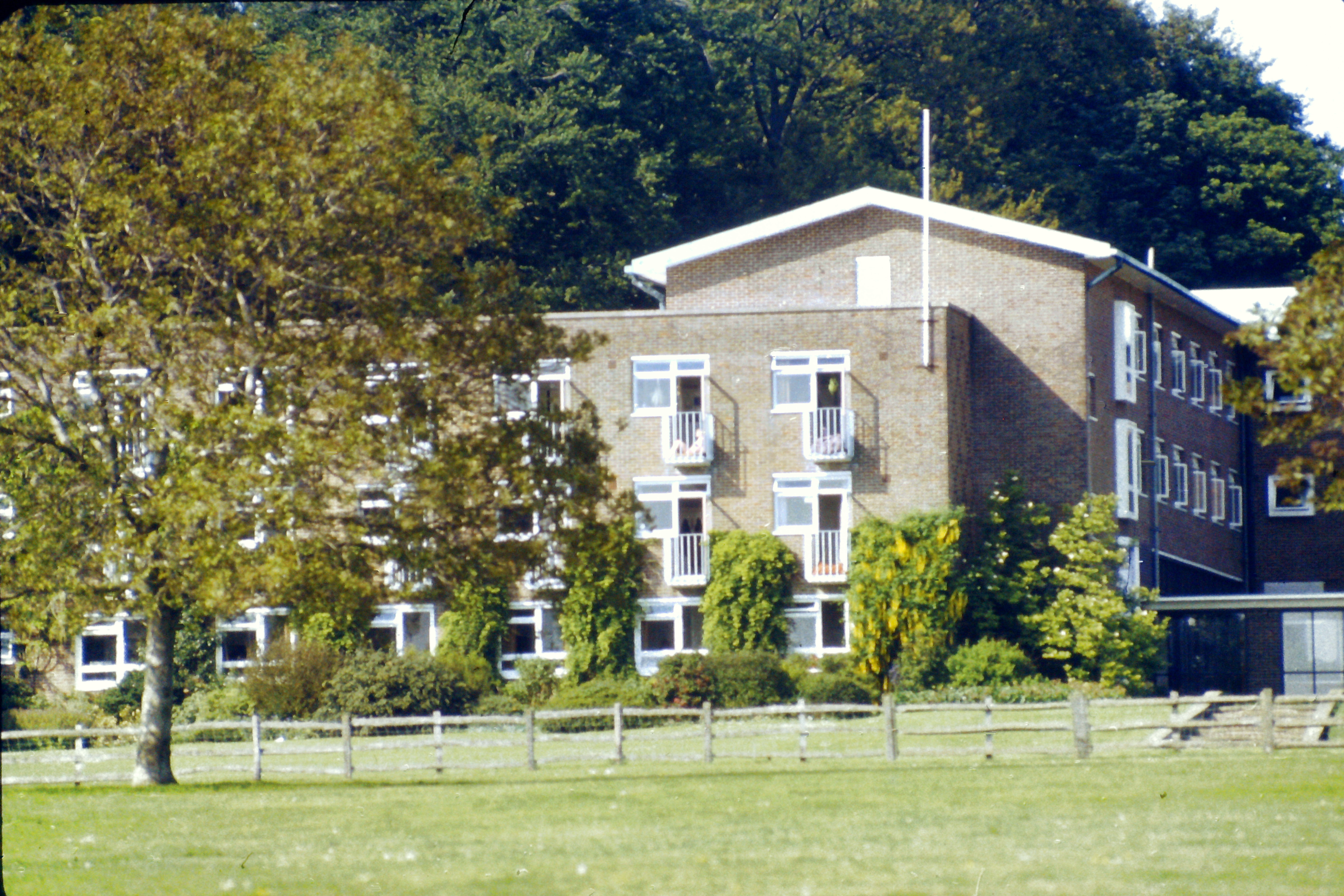
Withersdane Hall, 1983

The original Withersane Hall was constructed in the early 1810s as a grand country mansion near the site known for its curative mineral well named for Saint Eustace.

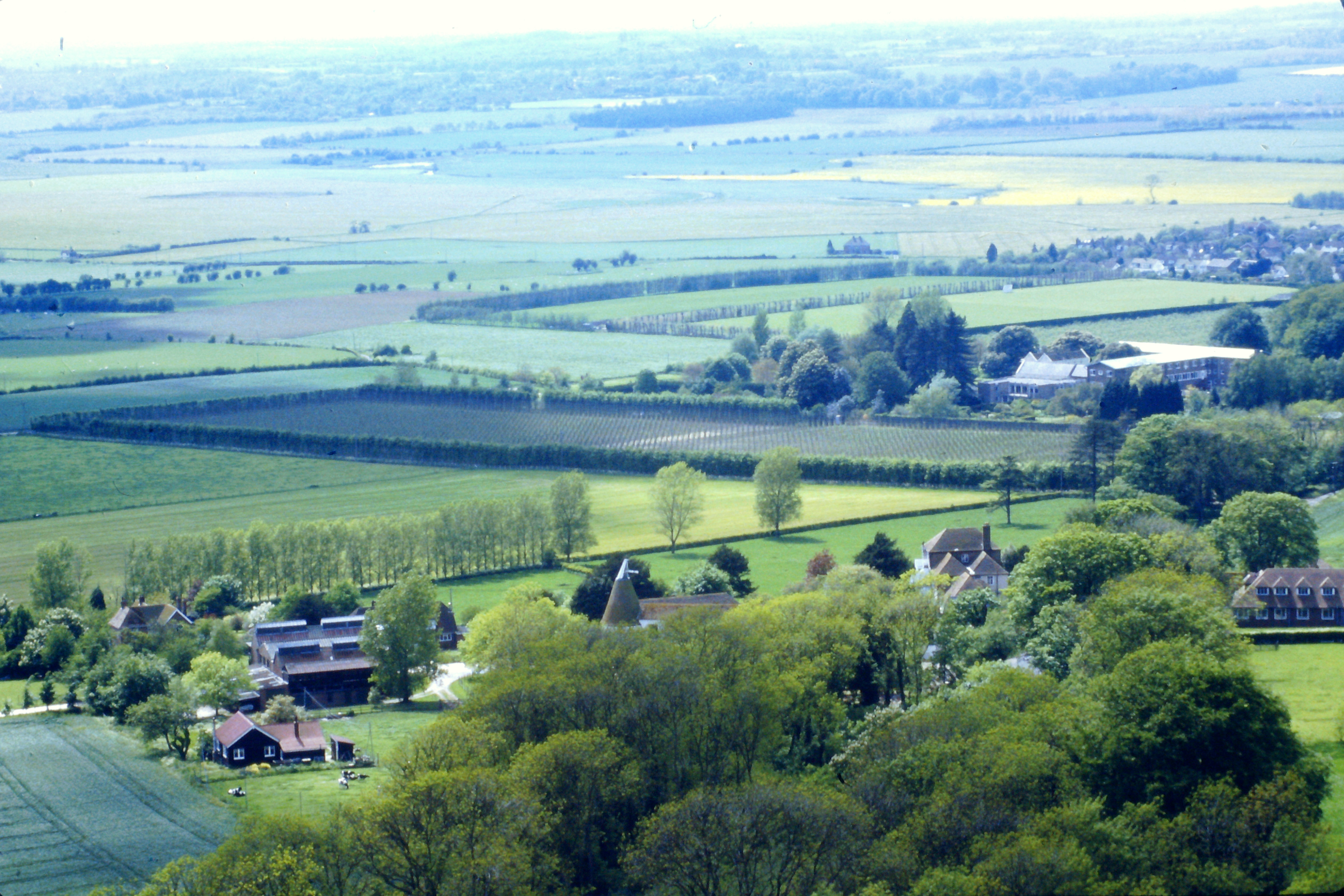
Coldharbour Farm and Withersdane Hall from Wye Crown

Russell Hoban repurposed Withersdane as "Widders Dump" in his 1980, post apocalyptic novel Riddley Walker. Wye became "How"; The Devil's Kneading Trough, "Mr Clevvers Roaling Place", and Pet Street, "Pig Sweet".

c. 1810	Withersdane Hall originally constructed as a grand, three-storey, country mansion.
c. 1840	Occupied by Captain Arthur Davies who farmed 300 acres (120 ha) with 16 labourers and a further eight domestic staff. The house was owned by his uncle William Fuller.
1867	Following Davies' death, the property was acquired by John Erle-Drax of Olantigh.
1881	Premises leased to market gardener William Aycliffe.
1881	Leased to land agent Frederick Beard and family.
1898	Occupied by Dean Crake, and his wife, who built a billiard room on the site of the later breakfast room.
1901	Vacant until 1903
1903	The Georgian mansion at Olantigh was destroyed by fire. Wanley Elias Sawbridge-Erle-Drax moved his household to Withersdane during reconstruction.
1912	Withersdane leased by Andrew Bigoe Barnard, former Deputy Director Criminal Intelligence of the Bengal Police Department
1928	Andrew Bigoe Barnard died.
1930	Andrew Bigoe Barnard's widow Florence purchased Withersdane Hall from the Erle Drax family and replaced the billiard room with the structure that later became the college's breakfast room.
1930s	Andrew and Florence's son Norman Barnard, commonly known as Chippy, "presided over a gilded era of garden parties and social events straight out of the pages of P G Wodehouse".
1930s	John Charles Wanley Sawbridge Erle-Drax, a relation of the Erle-Drax former owners, produced pageants at Withersdane Hall, once playing Nick Bottom in A Midsummer Night's Dream.
1930s	Visitors included future Lord Chancellor Quintin Hogg, and author Anthony Powell whose A Dance to the Music of Time roman-fleuve portrayed a golden era of country house parties, just like those he attended at Withersdane Hall.
1939	Norman Barnard worked for the Committee of Imperial Defence and was deputed to the underground Cabinet War Rooms.
1939	Barnard moved his mother and children from their London town house, to the ostensibly safer countryside at Withersdane. Young evacuees from East London were billeted with them. The conflict was not entirely distant; gas mask practice was frequent, and a bomb exploded nearby killing three sheep.
1940	On Monday 22 April 1940, Major Barnard and his wife May visited their children. During the return to London their car left the road on Charing Hill. Mrs Barnard suffered a broken leg, but he died later of head injuries.
1941	Withersdane Hall was requisitioned and fortified for the war effort It become a headquarters for the 43rd Wessex, and then the 56th (London), Divisions housing the divisional general and intelligence section. As of 2019, some remains of bunkers and pill boxes are extant from that period.

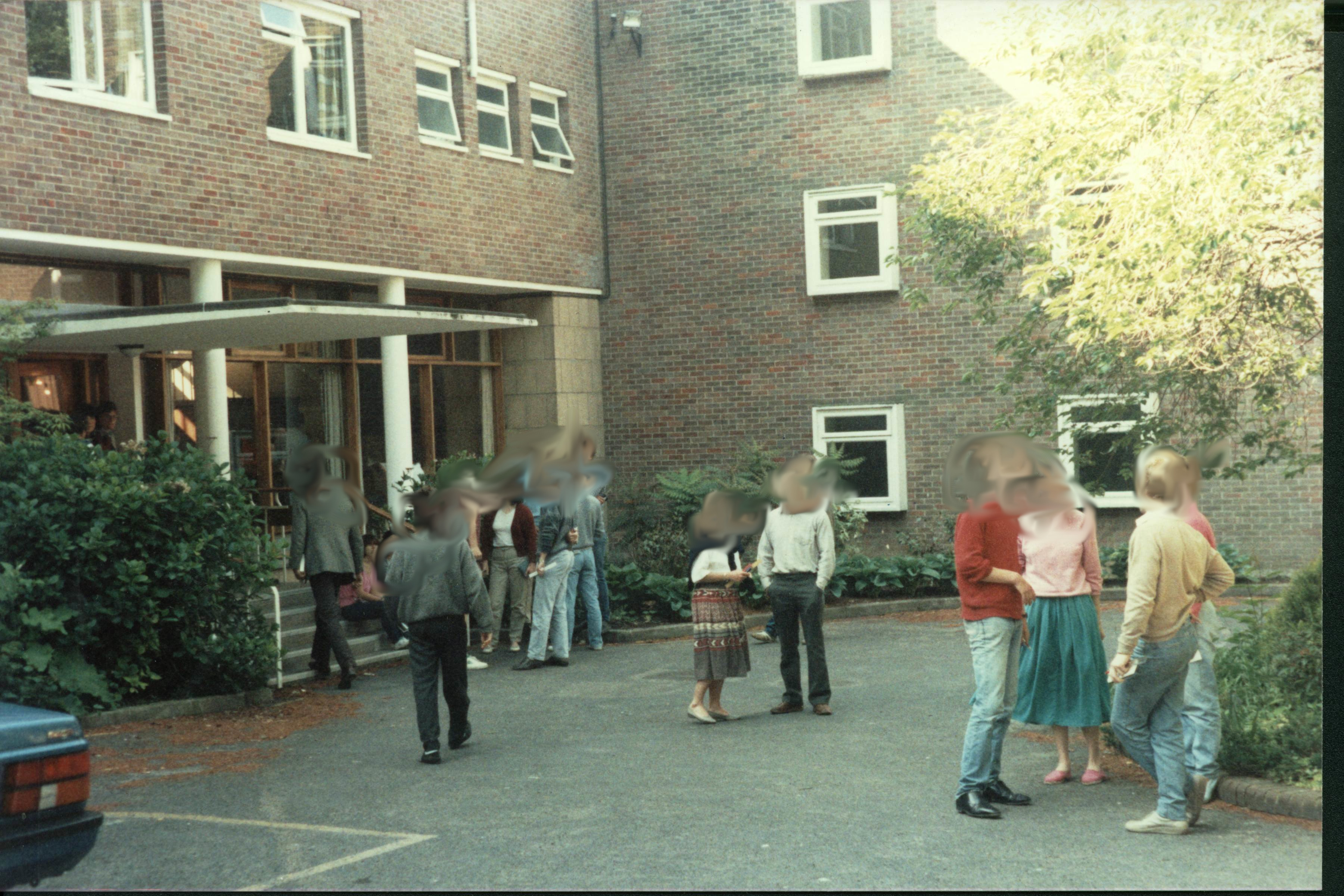
Withersdane Hall entrance, 1985

1945	Withersdane Hall purchased for £10,000 from Florence Barnard. Initially Swanley College students lived in the house, and temporary buildings erected on the site.
1946	Horticulture lecturer Mary Page redesigned the 3 hectares (7.4 acres) garden at Withersdane Hall to include extensive informal areas and a series of formal spaces separated by yew hedges within the walled garden.
1947	Amalgamation of South Eastern Agricultural College with Swanley Horticultural College as the Schools of Agriculture and Horticulture within the University of London. Swanley College's former premises had been heavily damaged during the war and it was decided to rebuild at a combined college rather than in Swanley.
1948	Three storey student accommodation block incorporating warden's flat constructed at Withersdane Hall.
1949	Foyer, cloakrooms, and student rooms above, built at Withersdane Hall.
1951	Swanley Hall (named for Swanley Horticultural College), kitchens, and rooms above completed at Withersdane Hall. Withersdane Hall officially opened by Princess Alice, Countess of Athlone.
1953	Withersdane Hall hosts artist Evelyn Dunbar's only solo exhibition.
1957	Evelyn Dunbar donated her large 1938 work, An English Calendar to the college and it hung at Withersdane Hall for many years. Post closure, the painting passed to Imperial College. Dunbar's husband Roger Folley was a horticulture lecturer at the college.
1975	CEAS premises built at Withersdane Hall.
1980	Queen Elizabeth The Queen Mother admitted as a Fellow of the college and shown the courtyard garden at Withersdane Hall named for her.
1986	Lloyds Bank hall of residence opened at Withersdane Hall.
1992	Dunstan Skilbeck Hall opened at Withersdane Hall named for the former principal.
1993	Bernard Sunley Hall opened at Withersdane Hall. The scheme, assisted by the Bernard Sunley Foundation, included larger, family accommodation for postgraduates.
2014	Imperial College leased Withersdane Hall as a rehabilitation clinic.
2019	Imperial College sold Withersdane Hall to the private, for profit, Università degli Studi Niccolò Cusano who intend to accommodate approximately 250, mainly Italian and French, students there.

=== Jacobean staircase ===
The grade I listed, Jacobean, three flight staircase adjacent to Wye College's cloister has been compared in significance to the grand staircases at Knole House. Its seven newel finials are large painted statues, two male and seven female, commonly referred to as the Ancient Britons. The largest male of the chestnut, Flemish style figures is believed to represent Hercules. They were separated from the newel posts for protection against students who pelted them, and placed for safe display on the nearby Old Hall's minstrels' gallery.

Imperial College sold the statues in 2009 as reproductions. English Heritage and Ashford Borough Council ordered that Imperial College repurchase and return them, which it did.

=== Students' Union ===
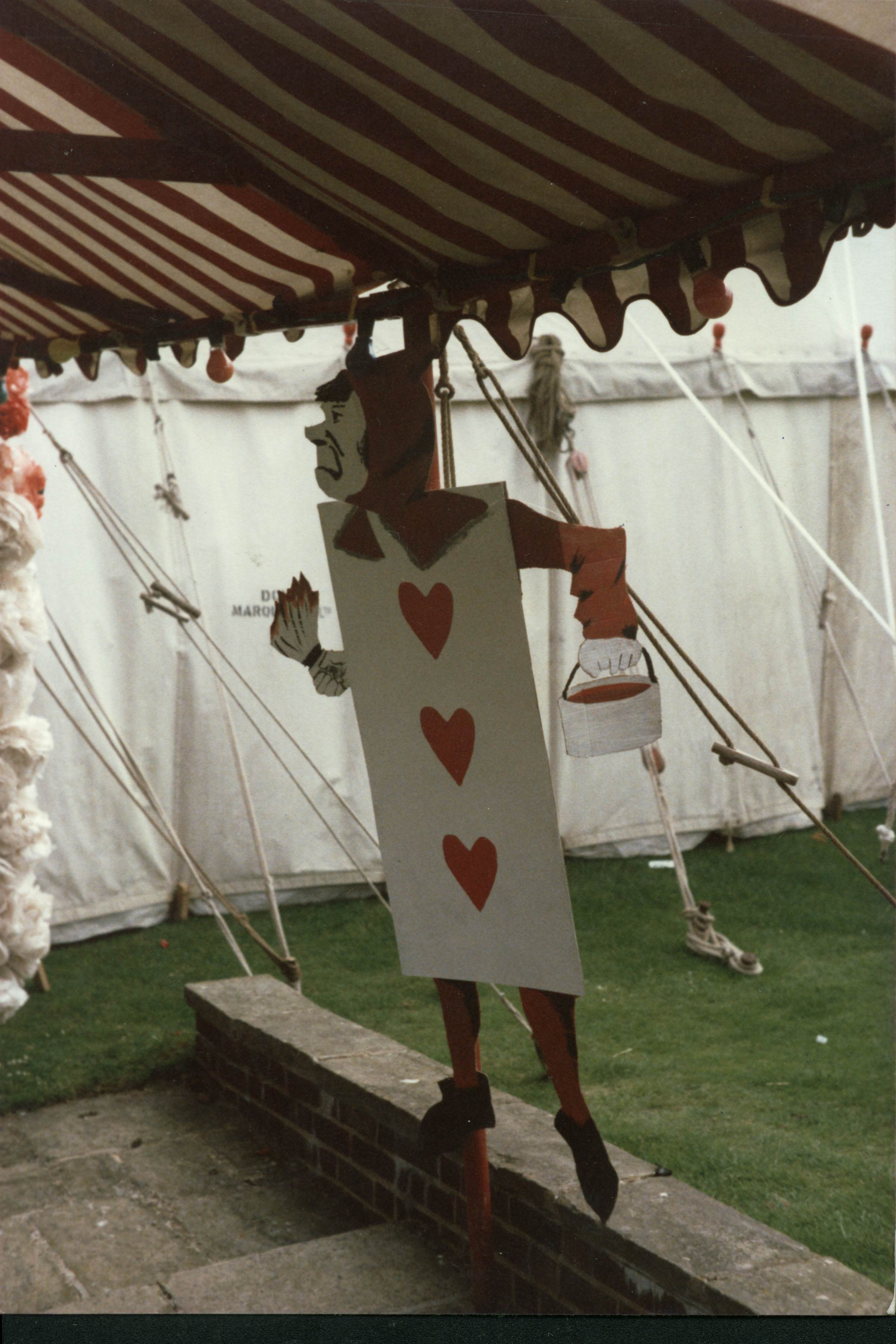
Card decoration from Alice themed Commemoration Ball, 1985

A dedicated Students' Union complete with swimming pool opened in 1974, replacing the Wheelroom complex.

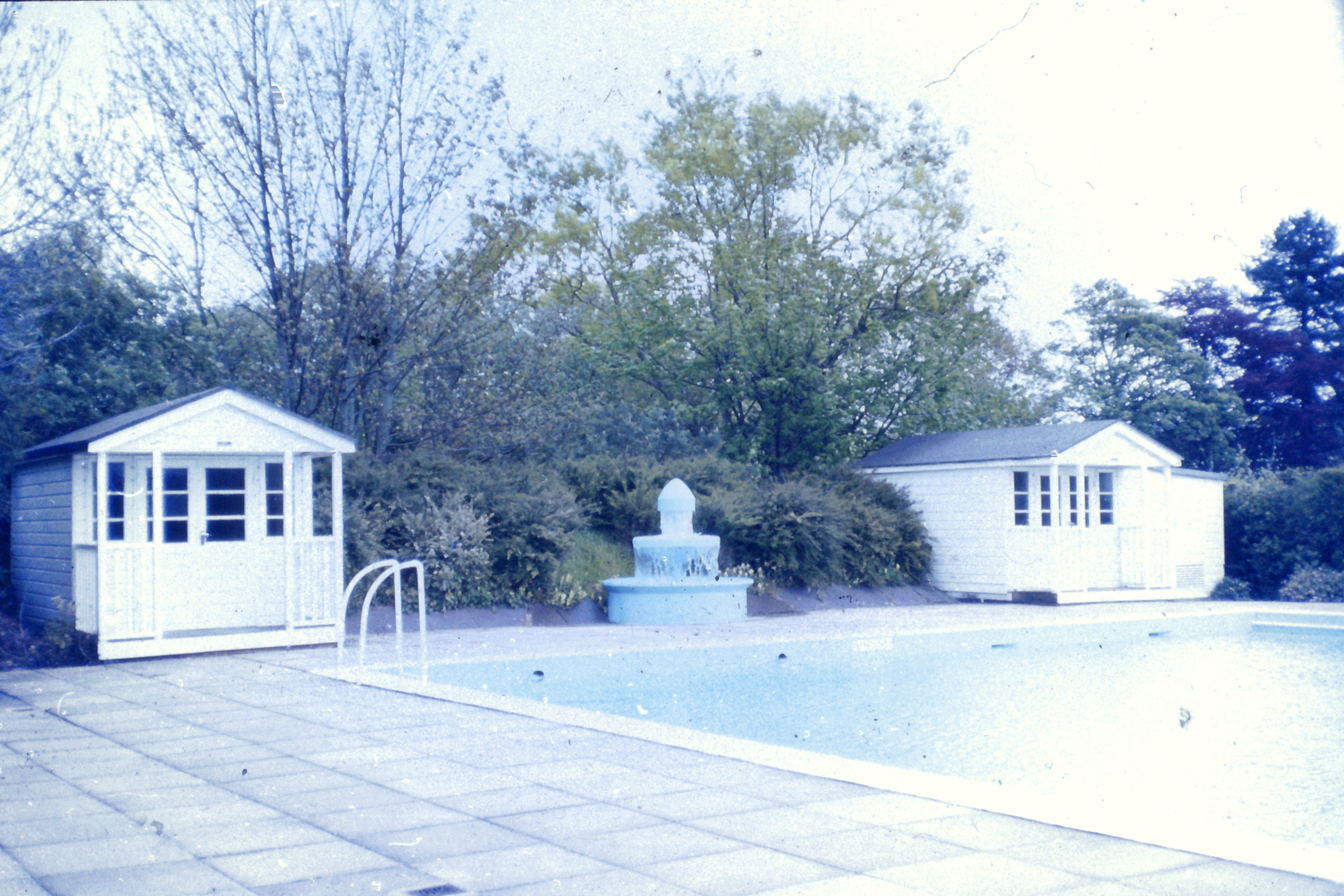
Students' union swimming pool, 1983

The Wye College Union of Students was NUS affiliated and a constituent union of ULU. Originally established at the South Eastern Agricultural College in 1894, in 2000 it merged with Imperial College Union.

=== Wye Crown and quarry ===
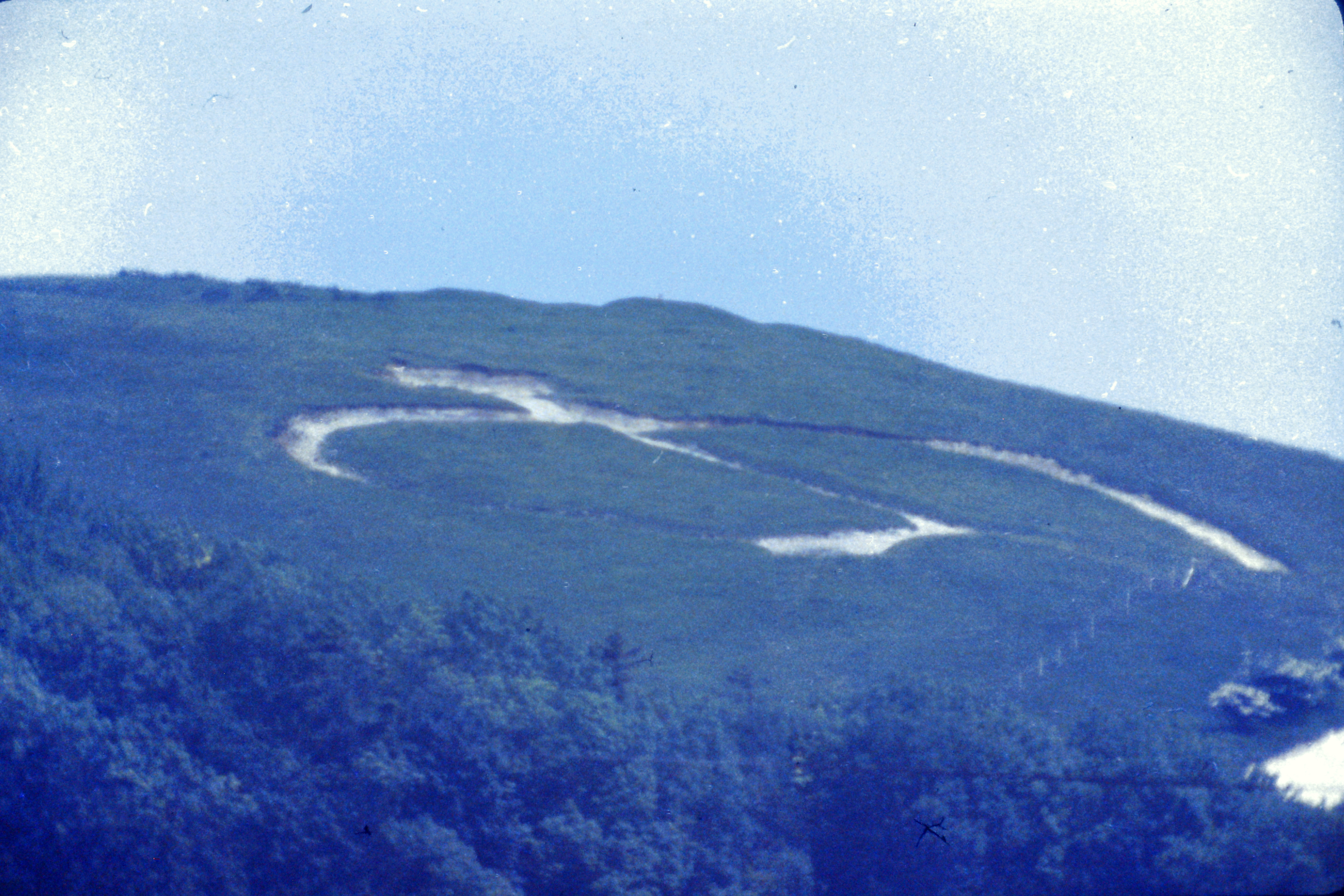
Wye Crown photographed from the college, 1983

51.18153°N 0.96231°E

During a parish meeting in 1902, the South Eastern Agricultural College's principal offered to celebrate the coronation of King Edward VII with a hill figure, carved into the North Downs scarp, above the college. Horses and humans carved into hillsides are well known, but the 180 foot (55 m) tall crown motif chosen was to be unique. It had to be distorted to take account of the viewpoint below and took 35 students four spring days, and 7,000 wheelbarrow loads of turf, soil and chalk to excavate. The King's 30 June coronation was delayed by illness, but there was still a bonfire on the Crown. When the coronation did take place on 7 August the Crown was illuminated by 1,500 candles. The King was able to view the Crown himself, as a guest of Baron Frederic John Gerard at Eastwell Manor, two years later when it was lit by electric light.

To mark the 1977 retirement of principal Harry Darling, before Wye College owned the crown field, students pegged out Goodbye Harry and marked it with herbicide, visible for all to see across the Stour Valley.

In 1991, gabions, filled with white-washed flint, were embedded at a cost of £29,000 to delineate the motif and reduce maintenance. Previously students had regularly scoured the exposed chalk and rebuilt its edges. The work was followed up in 2003, when a bench and carved slate compass rose were installed above the Crown, on the North Downs Way. The Millennium waymarker identifies directions to historic towns including Canterbury, Hastings and York, and is inscribed with the motto Floreat Wye or may Wye flourish. It rests on a time capsule containing articles relating to the area.

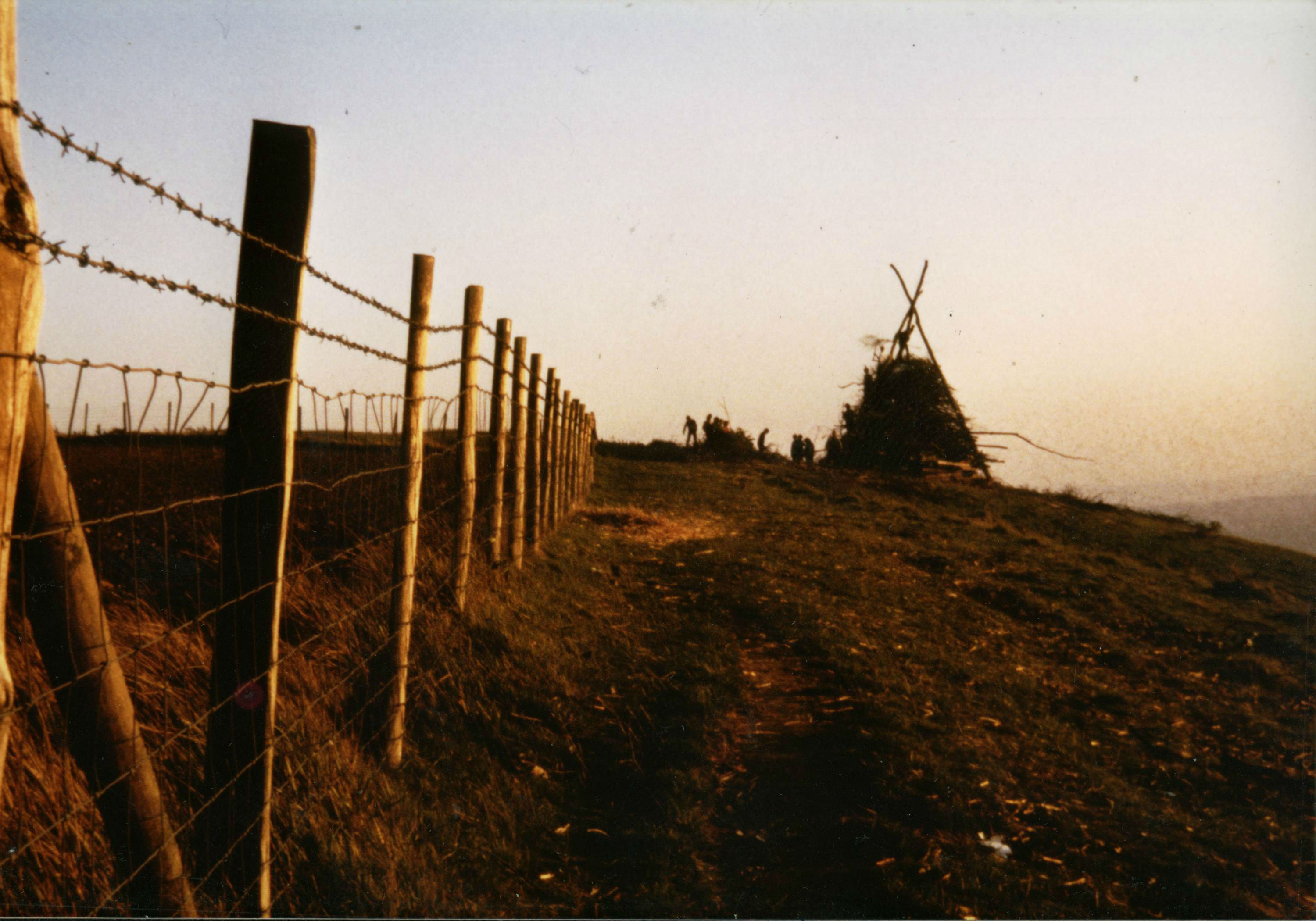
Charity week bonfire under construction on Wye Crown, 1983

Wye Crown has been a focus of celebrations for royal and national occasions, as well as Wye College students' charity week bonfires. In 2020, the Crown was illuminated to mark the 75th anniversary of VE Day, although during World War I and II it had to be camouflaged from enemy aircraft to prevent use as a navigation landmark.

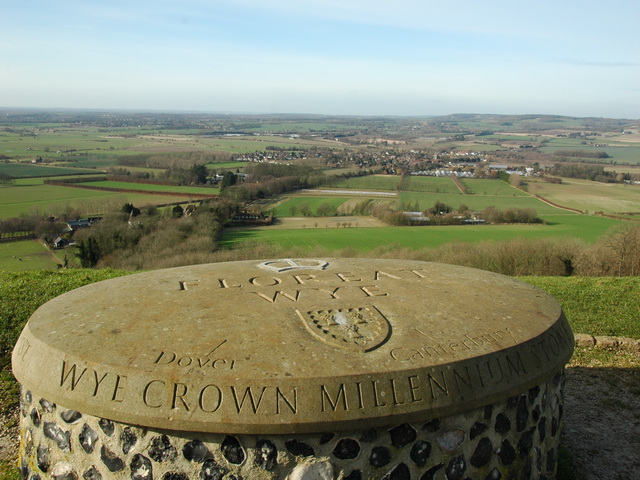
Waymarker, 2008

Behind the bench and way marker are numerous small hollows believed to be ancient ironstone pits. The features acquired a mythology among Wye College students and spoof traditions were attributed to inscriptions on stone tablets supposedly found there.

The college's former quarry, below Wye Crown was a source of flint and chalk, the chalk likely burnt for construction lime. Wye College students used it for clay pigeon shooting and spectacular parties, causing marginally less disruption than the machine gun training there during World War II. In 1991, part of the slope was converted to seating arranged as a natural, outdoor amphitheatre.

Wye Crown and quarry form part of the Wye National Nature Reserve. Its thin, seasonally grazed chalk grassland provides an ideal habitat for orchids.

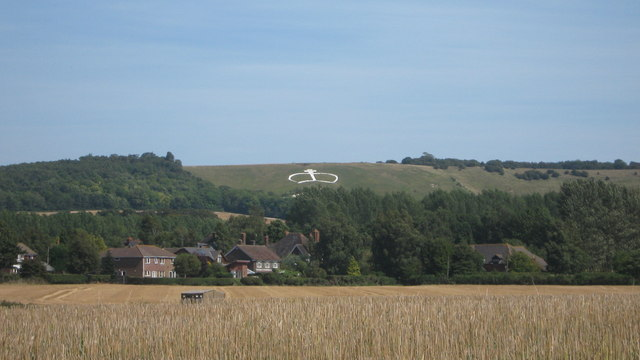
Wye Crown and estate, 2009

== Legacy activities ==
=== External Programme ===
The Wye College External Programme, established in 1988 under Ian Carruthers and Henry Bernstein, was the first use of exclusively, distance learning by the University of London. The programme built upon Wye's established research and teaching links to the rural developing world, especially in Africa and combined resources from existing departments to offer rural development and other cross disciplinary MSc and Postgraduate Diploma courses.

Developing the 50 courses cost Wye College £2 million. Learning resources were initially on paper, supplemented by audio cassettes; videotapes, and 24-hour telephone support. The World Wide Web was embraced later.

The programme received a Queen's Anniversary Prize for Education in 1994, the first year the awards were granted. A citation commended the unique programme for providing quality professional development to agriculturalists at a third the cost of overseas students in the UK, and its ability to project even into war torn countries thereby assisting their recovery.

By 2000, Wye's External Programme had 975 mid-career professionals registered from 120 countries, and was growing. In 2007, it became the Centre for Development, Environment and Policy of SOAS, albeit initially from the Wye campus. This arrangement allowed enrolled students to be awarded their contracted University of London degrees but deprived Imperial College of a programme it had been enthusiastic about acquiring.

=== Hop research ===
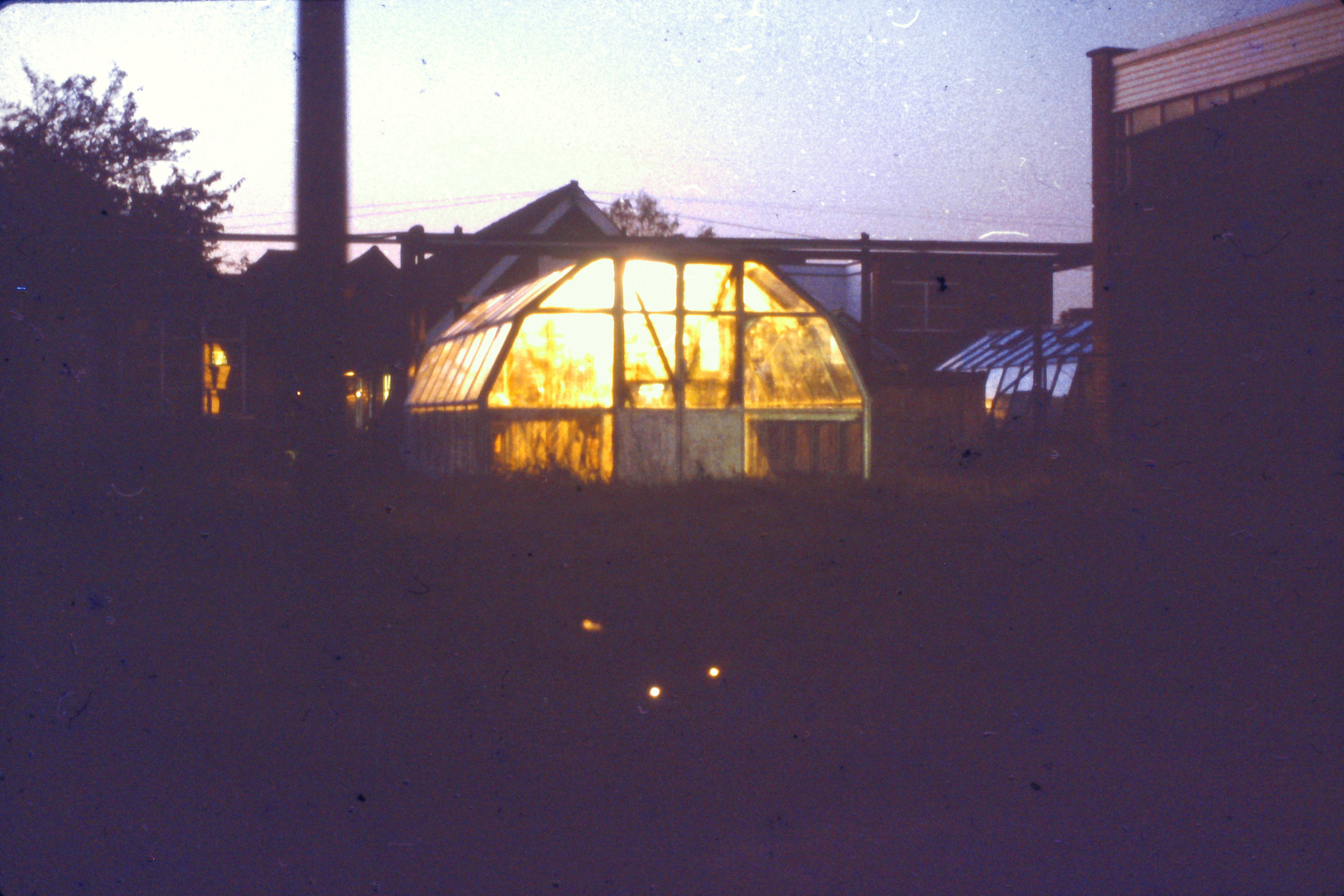
Research greenhouse viewed from Squires hostel with Guinness Laboratories, laundry and Jubilee Building in background, 1983

Mycologist and accomplished tennis player, Ernest Stanley Salmon established a systematic hop breeding programme at the college in 1906. It was the world's first, and a model for those that followed. The importance of his work was rapidly understood so while the college's other hop gardens were grubbed out in 1917 to grow potatoes and support the war effort, Salmon's trial plots were spared.

Seeking fungal resistance he crossed European plants with seeds grown on from a wild Manitoban hop cutting, and thence bred varieties including Brewer's Gold (1934), Bullion (1938), and Northern Brewer (1944). It was estimated in 2005 that over half of all hops grown commercially worldwide were descended from Salmon's original seedlings. Ray Neve succeeded Salmon in 1953 producing varieties such as Wye Northdown (1971), Wye Challenger (1971), and Wye Target (1972).

In 1981, Peter Darby took over the programme focussing on dwarf hops such as First Gold (1995); aphid resistance (Boadicea, 2004), and flavour. At that time, the college's breeding programme was producing 30,000 plants a year to evaluate.

The unit merged into the newly formed Horticulture Research Institute in 1985; through subsequent consolidation became part of Horticulture Research International in 1990, and spun off with East Malling Research Station to form East Malling Research in 2004. As Imperial College sought to close their Wye campus in 2007, hop research activities transferred to Wye Hops Ltd, a subsidiary of the British Hop Association, based at China Farm, Upper Harbledown. As of 2019, Wye Hops' national hop variety collection has been relocated to Shepherd Neame's Queen's Court at Faversham.

=== Cyclamen persicum ===
In the 1960s, Allan Jackson's breeding programme at Wye crossed large flowered cyclamen with wild forms, producing smaller houseplants with scented, elongated flowers and attractively marked foliage. These became known commercially as the "Wye College Hybrids" and as of 2021, continue to be produced.

The hybrid varieties include Wye Downland (white), Admiral (orchid-mauve), Peacock (pinky / red) and Fritillary (dark-red and jewel colours). Those named after butterflies are fragrant and breed true to the colour of their namesakes.

=== Biological pest control ===
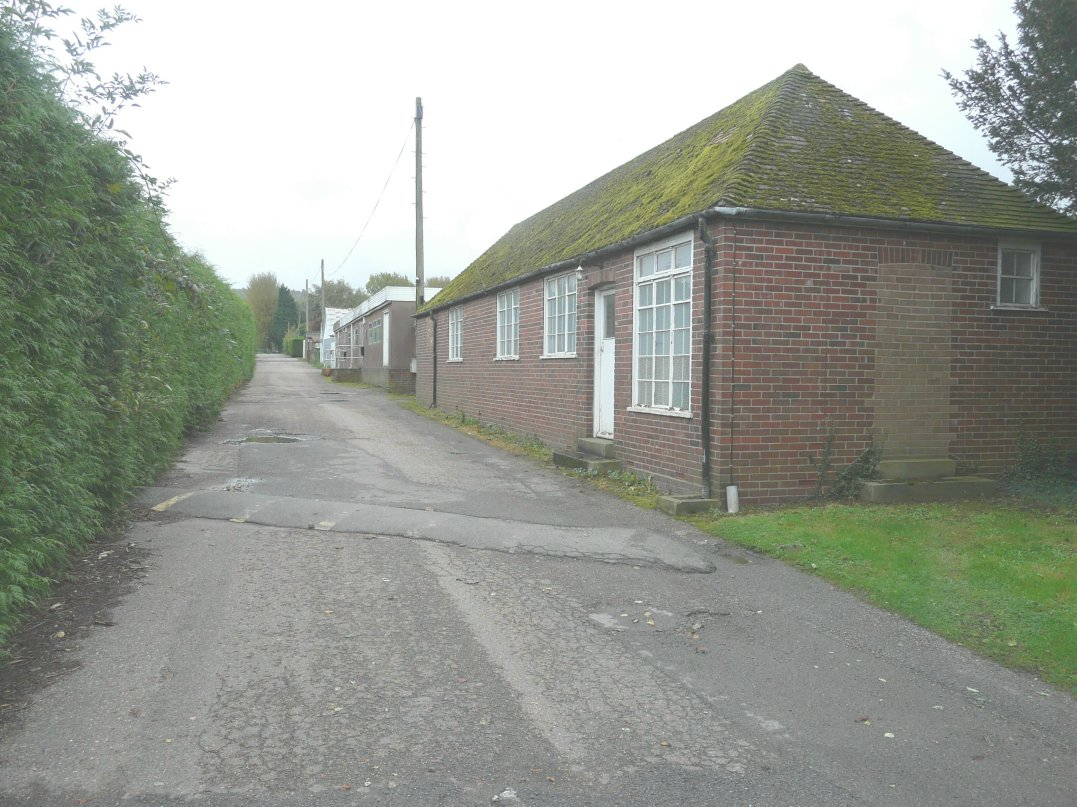
College buildings on Occupation Road, 2013

The college explored biological methods of pest control and facilitated their widespread adoption. Mike Copeland's entomology team harnessed Australian ladybirds, and parasitic wasps to suppress mealy bug and soft scale insect pests. He launched Wye Bugs at the 1991 Chelsea Flower Show to make insect controls available to ordinary gardeners, and with the subsequent closure of Wye Campus to facilitate continued research. Wye Bugs occupied glasshouses and laboratory facilities to the north of Occupation Road but by 2019, when that site was presented for development, moved south of the track.

As of 2022, Wye Bugs supply biological control insects and pest deterrents, mainly on a wholesale basis.

=== John Nix Pocketbook ===
John Nix published the first edition of his Farm Management Pocketbook in 1966 and sales were estimated at 250,000 copies by the time he retired in 1989. As of 2022, it is in its 55th edition and known as the John Nix Pocketbook for Farm Management. Contents include information for budgeting, or benchmarking, that seeks to anticipate forthcoming trends.

For many years, Nix's colleague in the Wye College Farm Business Unit, Paul Hill, researched and co-authored the pocketbook. Nix died in 2018, and his pocketbook is published, as of 2022, by The Andersons Centre.

It was described in the International Journal of Agricultural Management as a "standard reference for business in agriculture".

=== Brook Agricultural Museum ===
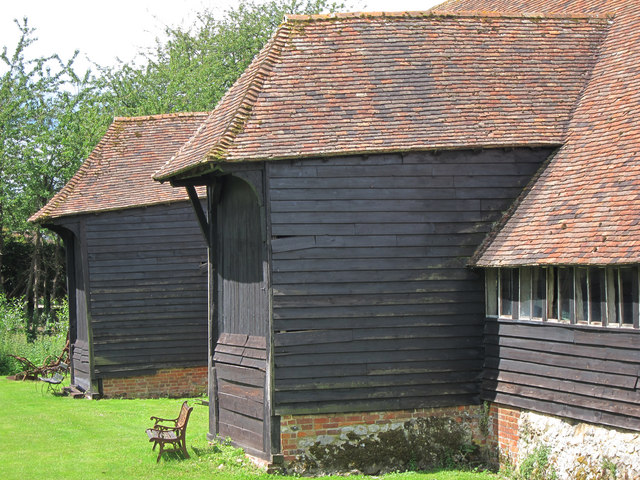
Brook Museum Barn

51.16028°N 0.95293°E

In 1948, Wye College agreed to be custodian to a collection of old agricultural implements acquired by former staff members. Students including Michael Nightingale undertook the transfer, cataloguing and arrangement of items, from East Malling Research Station to Coldharbour Farm. When Wye College purchased Court Lodge Farm, Brook in 1957, the growing collection was transferred to the 14th century crown post roof Manorial Barn there.

In 1996 the college decided to sell the adjoining Principal's House at Court Lodge. Wye Rural Museum Trust, again led by Michael Nightingale, was established to take over the collection. With help from grants and donations the trust purchased its barn at Brook in 1997.

As of 2022, the museum operates regular summer opening hours to the public.

=== CEAS ===
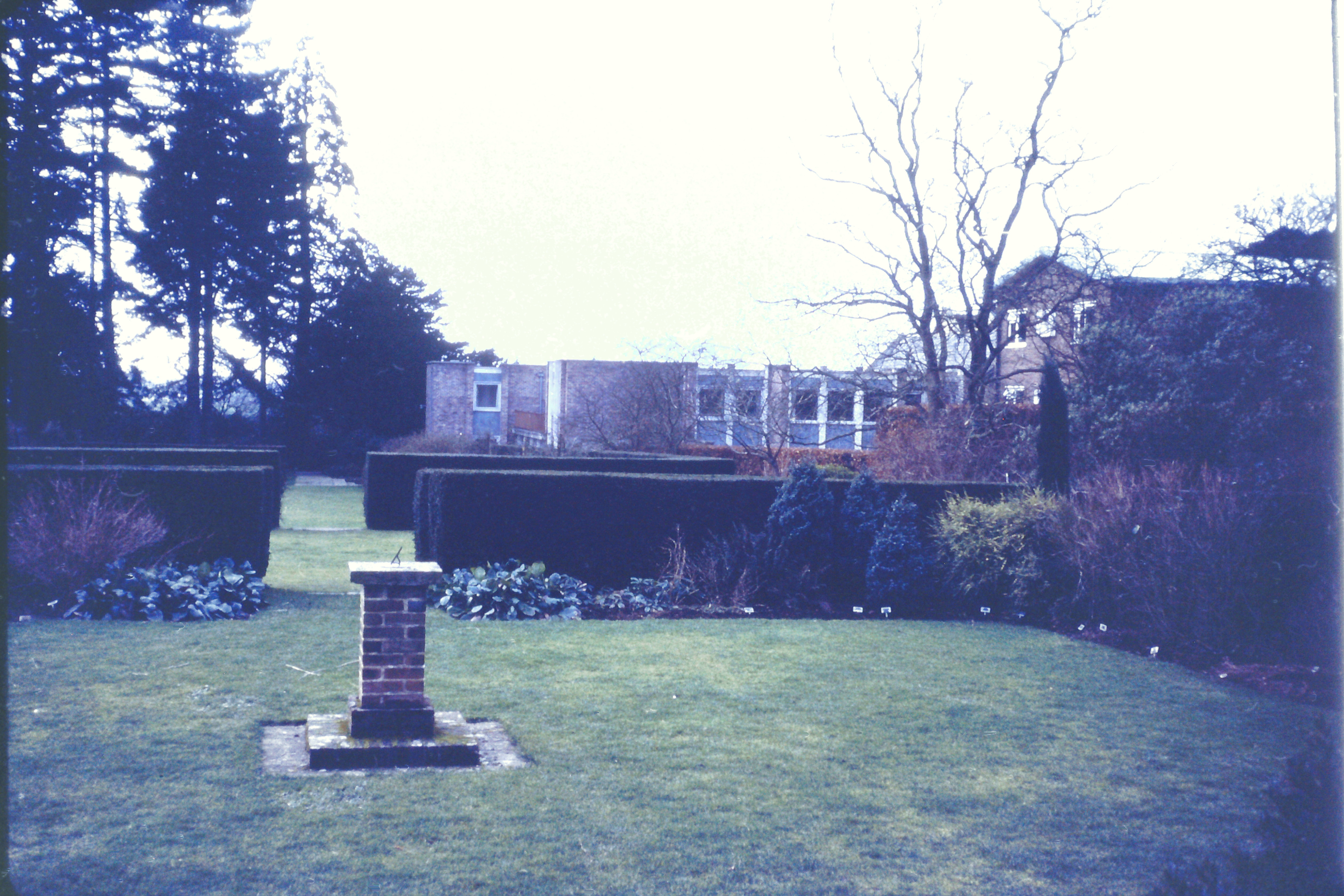
CEAS, Withersdane Hall, 1983

51.17971°N 0.94827°E

The Centre for European Agricultural Studies was conceived at Wye College in 1971, within the Department of Agricultural Economics. As the UK joined the European Common Market, agricultural affairs in Britain were expected to be strongly influenced by Europe's Common Agricultural Policy. The centre was intended to be an independent research centre focused on implications for UK food, farming and rural communities of these new policy directions.

A 1973 appeal raised £463,000 to support the research and in 1975, Henry Plumb opened the purpose-built £650,000 premises and European Documentation Centre at Withersdane Hall. The Frank Parkinson Lecture Theatre there was supported by a grant from the Frank Parkinson Agricultural Trust and incorporated facilities for live translation of speakers. Space was provided to accommodate visiting academics.

By 1990, CEAS was providing a venue for the Worshipful Company of Farmers Advanced Management Course and specialist training to Lloyds and National Westminster Bank. The conference facility had a turnover of £200,000 and was booked up two years in advance.

CEAS Consultants (Wye) Ltd incorporated in 1985 to undertake CEAS's commercial consultancy work, and Wye College held a 2/11 ownership stake that subsequently passed to Imperial College. By 1990, it had established a satellite office in Brussels. In 2006, CEAS Consultants (Wye) Ltd moved from Withersdane Hall to Bramble Lane, Wye and as of 2022, it operates, as Agra CEAS Consultants Ltd, at an address in Berkshire.

Following changes to Common Agricultural Policy priorities, the centre was renamed the Centre for European Agri-Environmental Studies. In 2006, it left the closing Wye Campus and became a Centre of the University of Kent in Canterbury.

== Wye College Beagles ==
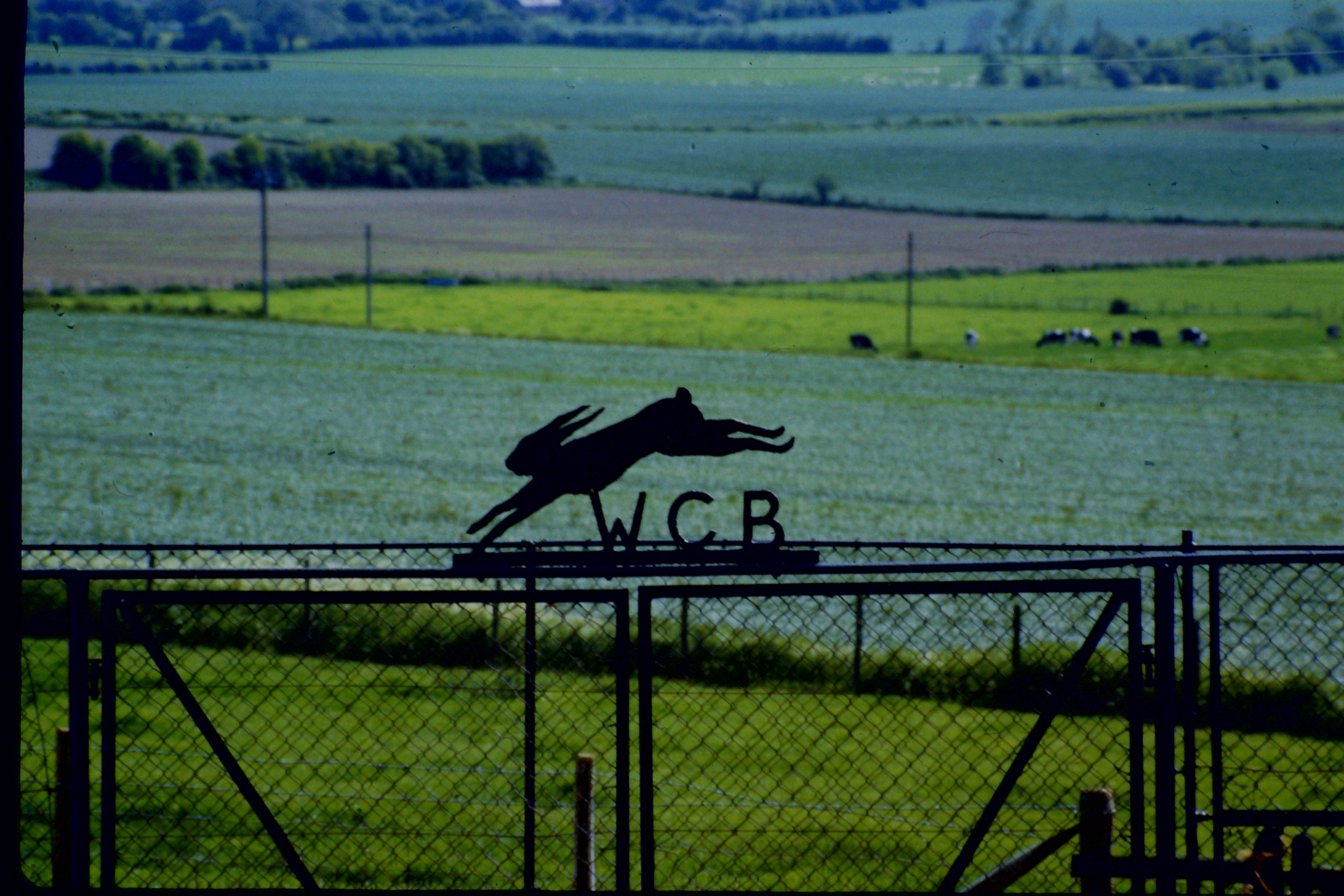
Entrance to Wye College Beagles kennels, 1983

51.18032°N 0.95963°E

John Stevens established a Wye College Beagle pack in 1947, encouraged by principal Dunstan Skilbeck who was chairman from 1947 to 1967, and the endeavour was largely run by students of the college. It disbanded in 2014, having been independent of the college since 2008 when the campus closed.

The first kennelman lived in an old double decker bus by the kennels, but as facilities developed Beagle Cottage was made available by the college to his successors.

Supporters of the beagle pack ran annual horse, and terrier shows from the 1950s to 1980s, and also a hunt ball and puppy show. Opponents of hunting within the college's student body organised their alternative "Anti-hunt Ball" on the same evening as the beagle hunt ball.

In 1988, at the invitation of Simon Block, Lay Sheriff, Wye College's beagles led the Lord Mayor's Parade through the City of London. They were accommodated the night before at Knightsbridge Barracks.

Wye College Beagles achieved national prominence in 2001 when Animal Liberation Front activists raided their kennels and took approximately 47 of the pack. It was reported the beagles had only caught one hare in the previous year.

== In popular culture ==
In the 1992 Darling Buds of May episode Stranger at the Gates, Pop Larkin's visit to the Kent County Council's offices is filmed at the college.

2007 television drama Cape Wrath includes scenes filmed at Wye College. The Old Lecture Theatre's steeply tiered, student-proof oak benches masquerade as a London academic institution.

== Alumni and staff ==
=== Agricola Club ===
The Wye College Agricola Club is an association of former students and staff of the college. It was founded in 1901 for the South Eastern Agricultural College, and from 1951 to 1995 was named the Wye College Agricola Club and Swanley Guild. From 2000 to 2009 it formed part of Imperial College's Imperial Alumni, but as of 2020 is an independent entity with some 3,000 members. The club publishes an annual journal, Wye: The Journal of The Wye College Agricola Club.

=== Staff ===
- Henry Bernstein
- Borbala Biro
- Allan Buckwell
- Mac Cooper
- Sir Daniel Hall
- Sir Ronald Hatton
- Max Hooper
- Sir Albert Howard
- Margaret Keay
- Audrey Lees
- Christopher Lloyd
- Norman W Moore
- Norah Lillian Penston
- John Percival
- Peter Posnette
- Samuel Pratt
- Francis John Richards
- J A F Rook
- Sir John Russell
- Ernest Stanley Salmon
- Frederick Theobald
- Ralph Louis Wain
- Gerald Wibberley
- Harry Hugh Wormald

=== Students ===
- Mary Abukutsa-Onyango
- J H Owusu Acheampong
- Neil Adger
- Adam Afriyie
- Carlos Agostinho do Rosário
- Christopher James Alexander
- David Allen
- Thomas Amarasuriya
- Sir Ray Avery
- Chris Baines
- Abdullahi Bala
- Horace Francis Barnes
- Allen Bathurst, 9th Earl Bathurst
- Cyril J Bergtheil
- Tom Bradshaw
- Charles Brennan
- Thomas Brett
- Sir Andrew Buchanan
- Paul Cloke
- Viola von Cramon-Taubadel
- C D Darlington
- Jon Edgar
- Heneage Finch, 5th Earl of Winchilsea
- Michael Abu Sakara Foster
- Fergus Garrett
- Michael Gough
- Patrick Grant, 5th Baron Strathspey
- Alfred Haines
- Carolyn Hardy
- Eric Hatfeild
- Sir Ronald Hatton
- Bill Hill
- Bertie Hoare
- Mark Hudson
- Toufic Jaber
- White Kennett
- Christopher Lloyd
- Paramu Mafongoya
- Charles William Mason
- David Moreton, 7th Earl of Ducie
- Masood ul-Mulk
- Michael Neocosmos
- Daphne Osborne
- Hackman Owusu-Agyeman
- Debbie Pain
- Ayaz Latif Palijo
- Rex Paterson
- Pauline Lesley Perry
- Robert Plot
- Rebecca Pow
- Major Keith Rae
- Edward Rigby / Coke
- Sir Charles Scudamore
- David Mohato Bereng Seeiso
- John Seymour
- Col Edgar Harold Strickland
- Sir Nigel Strutt
- Hugh Synge
- Horace J Taylor
- Desmond Vesey-Fitzgerald
- Andrew Waterhouse
- Alaric Alexander Watts
- Sir George Wheler
- Michael Winter
