= The Dance of Life =

Dance of Life may refer to:

- The Dance of Life (Munch), an 1899–1900 painting by Edvard Munch
- The Dance of Life (film), a 1929 American pre-Code musical film
- The Dance of Life (Eldridge), a 1951 set of panels by Mildred Eldridge
- The Dance of Life (album), a 1979 album by Narada Michael Walden

== See also ==
- Life Is a Dance (disambiguation)
- DanceLife, a 2007 dance-oriented reality show
