= Olantigh =

Country house in Wye with Hinxhill, Kent, England

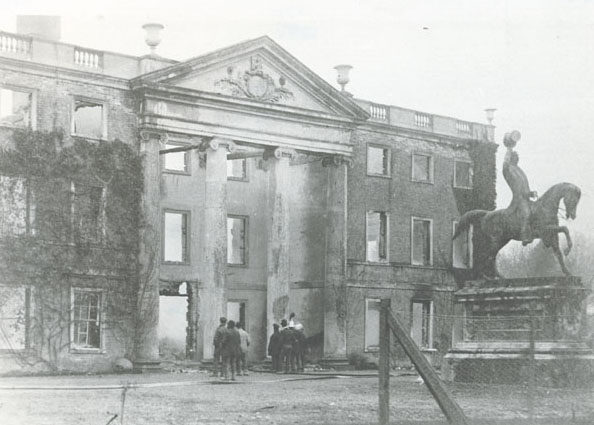
Olantigh after the 1903 fire with equestrian statue of John Erle-Drax

Olantigh is an English house 1 mile (1.6 km) north of Wye in the civil parish of Wye with Hinxhill, in Kent, England.

The garden terraces and towered stable block were Grade II listed in 1989 and extend to 20 acres (8.1 ha), beside the Great Stour river. Garden features include a wide variety of trees with woodland walks; rockeries, shrubbery, herbaceous borders and extensive lawns.

51.19862°N 0.94674°E

== History ==
The igh in the latter part of the name Olantigh often refers to islands, possibly a reference to the original dwelling being in the vicinity of an isle set in the River Stour. Alternatively, it has been proposed "Olentege" is Old English for "Holy Mount".

During Julius Caesar's 54 BC invasion of England he established a camp on the River Stour near to the present Olantigh. His forces faced several sharp skirmishe with British forces attacking from their stronghold at Challock Wood.

=== Kempe ===
The first known holder of the manor of Olantigh was Sir Norman Kempe (c. 1235–1295). Notable Kempes to live at Olantigh included John Kemp (1380–1454), Archbishop of Canterbury, and his nephew Thomas Kempe (died 1489), Bishop of London. Sir Thomas Kemp rebuilt the house in 1508.

=== Thornhill ===
When Sir Thomas Kempe died c. 1607 without a son, Olantigh was sold to Sir Timothy Thornhill. In 1679 John Locke spent some time in residence as doctor for Caleb Banks, son of Sir John Banks, then a tenant there of Sir Timothy's stepson Henry Thornhill (died 1689).

Royalist Colonel Richard Thornhill, the grandson of Timothy Thornhill, and husband of Lady Joanna Thornhill was described as chief agent in Kent of the 1655 Sealed Knot Penruddock uprising. As a result of his resistance to the Commonwealth, in 1706 (?) he was fined as a Delinquent by Parliament and allegedly became hopelessly involved in drinking and gambling. Eventually, and after much obstruction on his part, he obtained Parliamentary permission to appoint trustees that would sell the 600 acres (240 ha) estate and pay his debts.

Following the Stuart Restoration Lady Thornhill joined her brother in Whitehall Palace and became a Woman of the Bedchamber to Catherine of Braganza.

=== Sawbridge ===
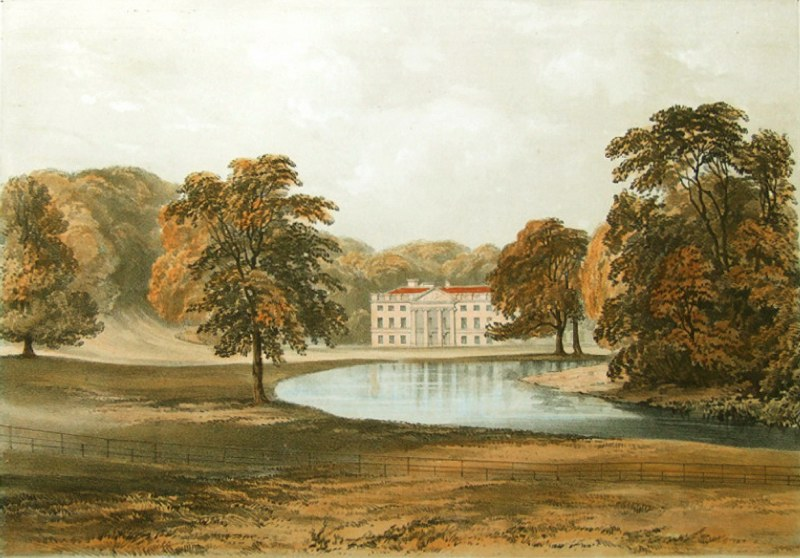
Olantigh 1845

Olantigh was purchased in 1720 by Jacob Sawbridge, a director of the South Sea Company though his position was subsequently reduced by its crash. Daniel Defoe described him as one of the three capital sharpers of Britain. He was expelled from the parliamentary pocket borough of Cricklade with his property forfeit by Parliament to compensate victims of his schemes. Nevertheless he held on to his home at Olantigh until death in 1748.

Jacob's grand-daughter, the whig, republican historian, Catharine Macaulay, (1731–1791) was born and brought up at the house.

Jacob's son John built his finances through two marriages to wealthy brides and refaced the front of the 1508 building.

John's son John Sawbridge again increased the family's fortunes through advantageous marriages, and substantially extended the Olantigh mansion. His additions included the massive Georgian stone portico and pediment. He became Lord Mayor of London in 1773.

According to Hasted, by 1798 Sawbrige's Olantigh estate encompassed half of the [Wye] parish including Wye Court, Harville, Coldharbour, Fanns Wood, Wye Downs and Naccolt. The Gentleman's Magazine in 1795 described his home as the magnificent seat of Olantigh, but that would just be a starting point for his grandson.

=== Zenith ===
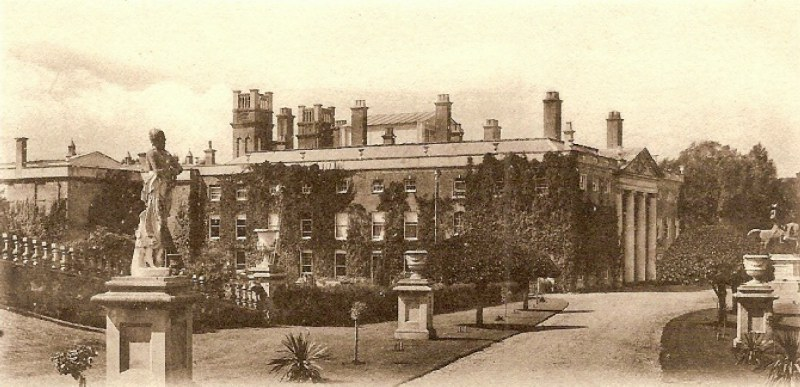
Olantigh before 1903 fire

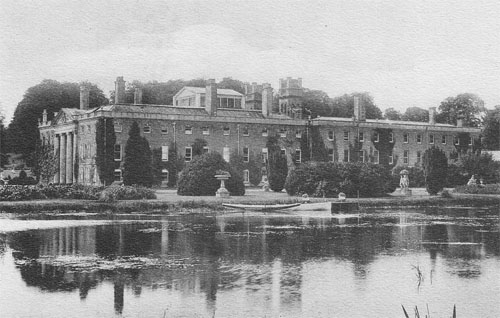
Olantigh before 1903 fire

The estate passed down to John Samuel Wanley Sawbridge, (1800–1887) on his father's death in 1851. The son was Member of Parliament for Wareham 1841–57, 1859–65 and 1868–80 without a single statement recorded in Hansard.

On 1 May 1827 he married Jane Frances Erle-Drax Grosvenor at St George's Church, Hanover Square, London. After the 1828 death of her brother, his wife's fortune included Charborough House and Ellerton Abbey estates, as well as sugar plantations in Barbados and Jamaica. Sawbridge then appended his wife's family name of Erle-Drax to his own though commonly referred to by the much shorter nickname The Mad Major, or less kindly as The Wicked Squire.

Following abolition of slavery, Erle-Drax received £4,293 12s 6d compensation in 1836 for the 189 slaves he had to free.

Erle-Drax's passion was building. At Charborough he constructed a 3 miles (4.8 km) long wall, while in Kent additions included picture galleries and Venetian towers, one of which is extant on the stable block. To reflect this new grandeur the extended house was renamed Olantigh Towers. Its north side facing the River Stour grew to 200 feet (61 m) wide. Galleries were laden with Italian Renaissance paintings, and other works, from artists including Ruisdael, Claude, Bugiardini, Fidanza, Aspertini, Raphael, Bertucci and Melone.

Landscape works included widening a canalised branch taken off the river to form an ornamental lake with island, and to the east of Olantigh Road extensive parkland and a 3 hectares (7.4 acres) circular walled kitchen garden.

By 1878, Olantigh was particularly noted for its statuary. Erle-Drax had an equestrian statue of himself erected in front of the house's grand portico. and stags, the Erle-Drax mascots, were placed prominently. He purchased the Hubert Fountain.

=== Fire ===
In December 1903, Olantigh was owned by The Mad Major's nephew, Wanley Elias Sawbridge Erle-Drax, vicar of Almer, Dorset, when fire gutted the Georgian mansion. He only escaped by climbing down ivy on the exterior walls clutching his wife's portrait and jewellery.

The cause had been a chimney fire in the dining room. A fire engine was summoned by bicycle and Ashford's horse drawn steam pumper responded, drawing water from the ornamental lake, but much of the house was devastated; the roof collapsed. Many priceless objects including paintings, sculpture and carvings were lost, including a malachite vase which Queen Victoria once wished to purchase. Fortunately the picture gallery was saved by an iron door and the family's archives survived.

The household temporarily moved to nearby Withersdane Hall which had been added to Olantigh's estate in 1867.

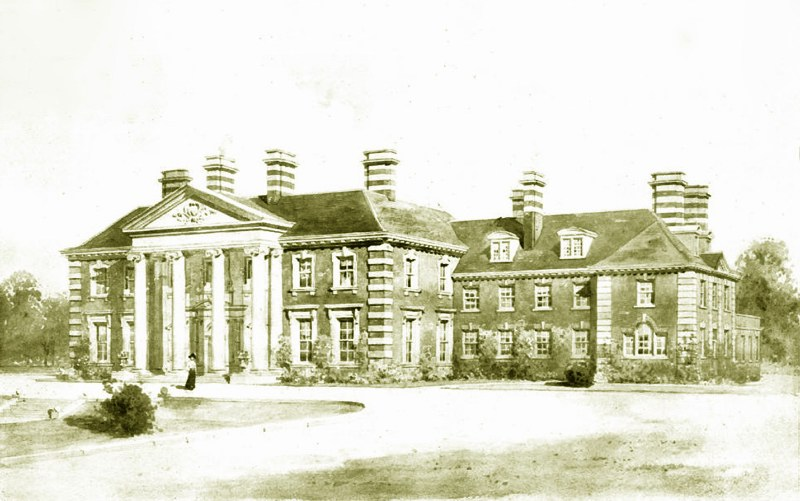
Olantigh rebuilt 1911

In 1910, Erle-Drax commissioned architects A. Barnett Brown and Ernest Barrow to design a new house incorporating the original stone portico. The footprint was moved, with the portico 70 feet (21 m) from its original position, and the smaller scale, red-brick mansion was finished in 1911. The architects were best known for maintenance on masonic premises and this is an unusual example of a completed residence among their work.

=== Hubert Fountain ===
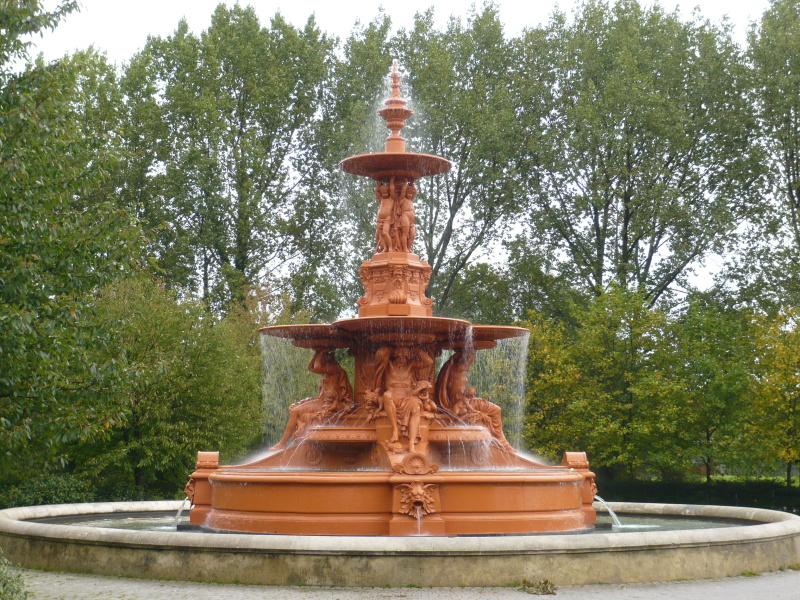
The Hubert Fountain, 2016

In 1912, an ornate cast iron fountain and pair of large stag statues at Olantigh were sold to Ashford Urban District Council Chairman, George Harper and removed to Ashford's municipal Victoria Park. The stags were removed, possibly due to their poor condition, in the 1950s, but as of 2022, the Hubert Fountain survives and is Grade II* listed.

It had originally been displayed at the Great Exhibition of 1862, one of a pair at the entrance to the Royal Horticultural Society's 22 acres (8.9 hectares) gardens at South Kensington. John Samuel Wanley Sawbridge Erle-Drax bought the fountain for £3,000 and moved it to Olantigh.

The other fountain of the pair was acquired by Daniel Ross; transported to Edinburgh, and now stands on Princes Street as the Ross Fountain.

Harper committed suicide, three weeks after donating the fountain, placing his head on a railway track by Ashford Warren ahead of an express train.

=== Loudon ===
In 1912, the house was let to John Hope Loudon, who redeveloped the gardens and partially filled in the ornamental lake to form water and bog gardens. His son, Francis William Hope Loudon, purchased Olantigh in 1935. The Erle-Drax family sold by auction some of the furniture they had left there. After World War II, the dwelling proved too large, and the, former picture gallery, west wing which provided two-thirds of the accommodation was demolished in the mid-1950s, leaving a house today only a fifth as large as pre 1903 fire.

The Engineer's November 1921 edition featured a novel sewage treatment and aeration system installed at Olantigh Towers. The arrangement devised by a former lecturer at the nearby South Eastern Agricultural College fed water from a weir on the River Stour to a turbine that powered chain pumps and blowers. The article claimed a reduction in odour and land required relative to traditional techniques. The modernisation used parts from a pre-existing sewage treatment system that had been built to deal with 1,000 imperial gallons (4,500 L) of raw human sewage daily – rather more than was required for the 1911 mansion. As of 1995 there was still a weir extant on the Stour at Olantigh.

From 1964 to 1977, Olantigh hosted Alfred Deller's intimate salon, Stour Music Festival. Performers that participated included Deller, his son Mark, Maurice Bevan and Concentus Musicus.

Alex Loudon (born 1980), from Olantigh, has played cricket for Kent and Warwickshire.

The great storm of 1987 caused catastrophic damage to established gardens and woodland at Olantigh.

== Description ==
...A drive leads off Olantigh Road through mid C19 rendered brick gate piers surmounted by urns at a lodge located c. 200m to the south-east of the house. It runs north-west across the pleasure grounds to arrive at the forecourt below the north-east front. A second drive branches off Olantigh Road at a point c. 380m further to the south; this runs north to the stable block which stands immediately to the south-west of the house.

...Olantigh Towers is a country house built of red brick with ashlar dressings under a plain tiled and hipped roof. It has a two-storey main block, with a seven-bay front and two rear wings off the south-west front. The entrance on the north-east front is marked by a projecting central Ionic pediment, the doors being flanked by niches containing paired sculptures of children.

...Much of the garden surrounding Olantigh Towers is enclosed by a mid C19 wall. Below the south-east front of the house is a formal terrace leading onto a large lawn with a circular fountain basin at its centre. The terrace was laid out as part of the mid C19 developments. At the western end of the terrace is an elaborate underground room, with an ornamental front of possibly C18 date, which may have been an undercroft or the cellar of a garden building. Above it stands a rockery laid out by Mrs Loudon in the early C20.

...On the north-east side of the house parterres, again focused on a fountain, lead into woodland groves planted in the 1850s on the rising ground from where there are views down to the house.

...Beyond the north-east lawn, c 100m to the north of the house, in the space between the two arms of the Great Stour river lies a water garden and bog garden. It is laid out with streams, pools, and bridges, a group of yews which stood on the island in the mid C19 lake having been retained as a feature.

— Historic England, 2001

== In popular culture ==
Author Russell Hoban may have repurposed Olantigh as "The Aulders" in his 1980, post apocalyptic novel Riddley Walker. Wye became "How"; Withersdane, "Widders Dump", and Ashford "Bernt Arse".
