= Lopat =

Lopat may refer to:

- Eddie Lopat (1918–1992), American baseball player
- LOPAT tests, biochemical tests introduced by Eve Billing in 1966

== See also ==
- Lopatcong Township, New Jersey, US
