= Thornhill Primary School =

Thornhill Primary School is the name of several schools.

In the United Kingdom:

- Thornhill Primary School, Rotherham
- Thornhill Primary School, Southampton
- Thornhill Primary School, Stirlingshire
- Thornhill Primary School, Cardiff
- Thornhill Primary School, Egremont, Cumbria
- Thornhill Primary School, Shildon, County Durham
- Thornhill Primary School, Islington, London

In Botswana:

- Thornhill Primary School (Gaborone, Botswana)

In Canada:

- Thornhill Primary School (Terrace, British Columbia)

See also:

- Lady Joanna Thornhill's Endowed Primary School, Wye, Kent, England
