= Evelyn Dunbar =

British war artist (1906–1960)

- Born: 18 December 1906; Reading, England
- Died: 12 May 1960 (aged 53); Hastingleigh, Wye, Kent, England
- Education: Royal College of Art
- Known for: Painting, murals, illustration

Evelyn Mary Dunbar (18 December 1906 – 12 May 1960) was a British artist, illustrator and teacher. She is notable for recording women's contributions to World War II on the United Kingdom home front, particularly the work of the Women's Land Army. She was the only woman working for the War Artists' Advisory Committee on a full-time salaried basis. Dunbar had a deep devotion to nature and a particular affection for the landscape of Kent. Dunbar was modest regarding her achievements and outside of the post-war mainstream art world which has led to some neglect of her work until recent years. She painted murals at Brockley County Secondary School, and was a member of the Society of Mural Painters. After the war she painted portraits, allegorical pictures and especially landscapes. She attempted a return to mural painting in 1958 with a commission at Bletchley Park Teacher Training College (which was renamed Lady Spencer-Churchill College, and finally incorporated into Oxford Brookes University), but was unable to fulfil the original specification.

== Early life ==
Dunbar was born in Reading, Berkshire, the fifth and youngest child of William and Florence (née Murgatroyd) Dunbar. Her father was Scottish, originally from Cromdale, Morayshire. In 1913 the family moved to Rochester, Kent, where William Dunbar established himself as a draper and bespoke tailor. Florence Dunbar, a Yorkshirewoman, was a keen gardener and amateur still-life artist. She was also a Christian Scientist and Evelyn Dunbar was also to remain a Christian Scientist throughout her life.

Evelyn Dunbar was educated at Rochester Grammar School for Girls, to which she had won a Kent County Council scholarship. Dunbar studied at Rochester School of Art (now the University for the Creative Arts) from 1925 to 1927, at Chelsea School of Art from 1927 to 1929. In 1929 she won an Exhibition to study at the Royal College of Art. She graduated ARCA (Associate of the Royal College of Art) in 1933. In 1940 the Tate Gallery purchased one of her early student works, Study for Decoration: Flight 1930.

Among her Royal College of Art tutors was Charles Mahoney. Encouraged by the Principal of the RCA, Sir William Rothenstein, Mahoney and a small group of fourth-year students including Dunbar were commissioned to decorate the assembly hall of Brockley County School for Boys, now Prendergast-Hilly Fields College, in south London with a series of murals illustrating Aesop's fables. Of the group Mahoney and Dunbar contributed most to the series, which was formally unveiled in 1936.

== The Brockley murals ==
The commission for Brockley County Secondary School (now the upper site of Prendergast School, Brockley) consisted of five arched panels, each measuring 12' x 7' (3.66m x 2.12m), plus a pediment-height panoramic frieze (8' x 39': 2.44m x 11.89m) together with a number of lunettes, spandrels and the three ceiling areas beneath the gallery. The two panels on the south side of the hall were painted by the RCA students Violet Martin and Mildred Eldridge. Mahoney painted two panels and part of the gallery ceiling, while Dunbar undertook the remaining north side panel, the frieze, a lunette, 22 of the 24 spandrels and four roundels on the central ceiling. Subjects for these smaller areas included Minerva and the Olive Tree, The Town Mouse and the Country Mouse, while the subject for Dunbar's panel was The Country Girl and the Pail of Milk. The source of most of the fables was Aesop.

The principal figure in The Country Girl and the Pail of Milk was modelled by the older of Dunbar's two sisters, Jessie. The subjects of Dunbar's murals and their interpretation predict the chief preoccupations of her artistic career. The frieze, a broad landscape of the area known as Hilly Fields was observed from the vantage point of a nearby water tower. Framed by two allegorical figures, the landscape is animated in the middle distance by dogs, people walking, pushing prams and working at their allotments. In the foreground are boys in the uniform cap and blazer of the then Brockley School engaged in various activities.

Dunbar and Mahoney spent some three years, from 1933 to 1936, completing the Brockley murals. During this time they formed a close relationship, which eventually ended in 1937. A collection of Dunbar's often lavishly illustrated letters to Mahoney covering their relationship between 1933 and 1937 are held in Tate Gallery archive. No letters from Mahoney to Dunbar remain.

== Books and illustration ==
In 1935 Dunbar was commissioned to provide the illustrations for The Scots Week-End and Caledonian Vade-Mecum for Host, Guest and Wayfarer (ed. Donald and Catherine Carswell, Routledge, London, 1936). The illustrations to this miscellany consist of pen and ink frontispiece, vignettes and tail pieces. This commission led to a more significant production, Gardeners' Choice (Routledge, London, 1937). This book, consisting of the history, characteristics and cultivation advice of 40 garden plants, illustrated in pen and ink, was jointly written and illustrated by Dunbar and Mahoney. Country Life magazine commissioned Dunbar to compose their Gardener's Diary 1938, a monthly journal and appointments book with literary texts chosen by Dunbar and illustrated with her pen and ink drawings.

In 1941 Dunbar provided the pen-and-ink illustrations for A Book of Farmcraft by Michael Greenhill (Longmans, London, 1942). This was a basic primer of husbandry for those who had little or no knowledge of farming. Its author, Michael Greenhill, was an instructor of recruits to the Women's Land Army at Sparsholt Farm Institute, near Winchester, Hampshire. Many of Dunbar's illustrations, contrasting the right way of undertaking some agricultural tasks with the wrong way, were made at Sparsholt, using recruits as her models.

== Pre-war painting ==
In the spring of 1938 Dunbar contributed four paintings to the Cross-section of English Painting exhibition at Wildenstein & Co., New Bond St, London. These included An English Calendar, a 6' (1.83m) square divided into 25 compartments, twelve of which feature gardening scenes reminiscent of her Gardener's Diary illustrations, and Winter Garden. Winter Garden, 1929, shows the Dunbar garden at Rochester, with the family house in the distance featuring a modest tower at the top of which Dunbar had her studio.

In late 1938 Dunbar opened The Blue Gallery, a large first-floor room above the shop run by her sisters Marjorie and Jessie at 168 High Street, Rochester. Here she displayed her own work and included some of her mother's floral still-life paintings. She invited Charles Mahoney (with whom she remained on friendly terms) and prominent contemporary artists Allan Gwynne-Jones, Barnett Freedman and Edward Bawden, to contribute their work to her first group exhibition, which opened in March 1939. The Blue Gallery did not prosper and it closed after a few months.

== World War Two ==
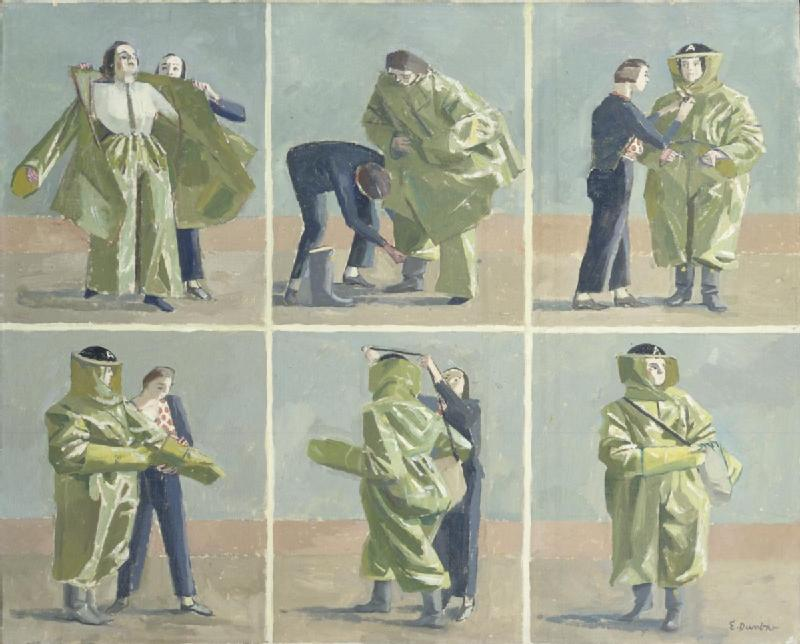
Putting on Anti-gas Protective Clothing (Art.IWM ART LD 247)

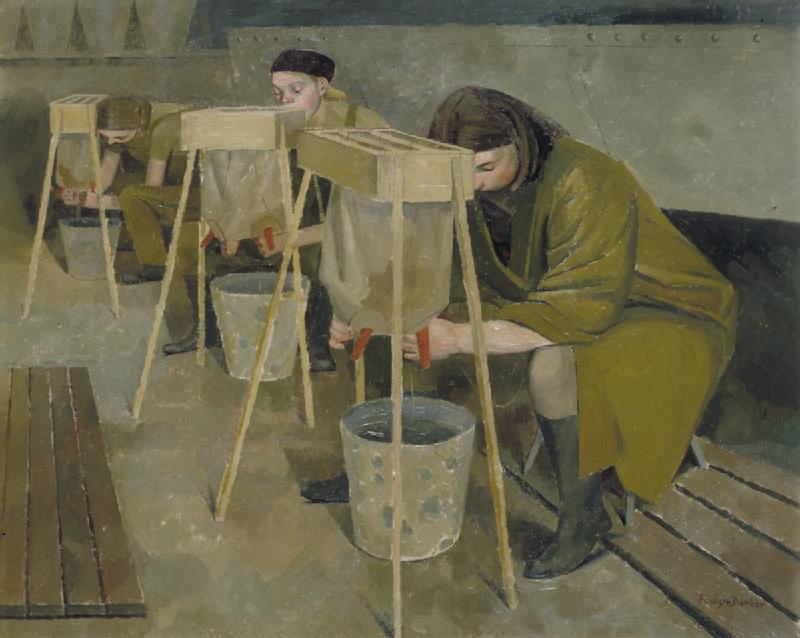
Milking Practice with Artificial Udders. (Art.IWM ART LD 766)

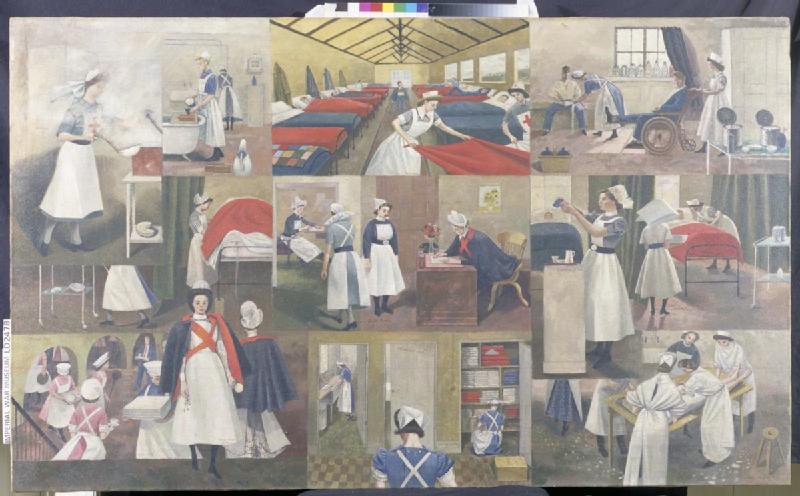
St. Thomas's Hospital in Evacuation Quarters (Art.IWM ART LD 2478)

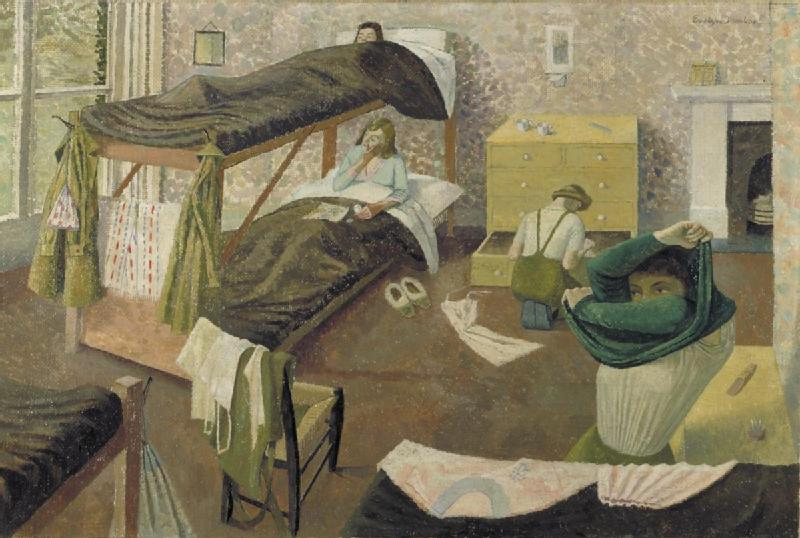
Land Army Girls going to Bed (Art.IWM ART LD 3351)

In April 1940 Dunbar was appointed by the War Artists' Advisory Committee, WAAC, as an official war artist, eventually becoming the only woman artist to receive successive and continuous salaried commissions throughout the war. Her brief was to record civilian contributions to the war effort on the home front. Her initial subjects were the activities of the Women's Voluntary Service, WVS, and later in the war, the Women's Land Army. By the end of the war Dunbar had some forty paintings accepted by WAAC.

Dunbar's early war-time paintings included,

- Putting on Anti-Gas Protective Clothing In July 1940 the Tate Gallery included this compartment painting in an exhibition of wartime art and it was also included in the Britain at War exhibition at the Museum of Modern Art in New York the following year.
- Milking Practice with Artificial Udders, – submitted to WAAC in September 1940.
- Women's Land Army Dairy Training Dunbar's visits to Sparsholt Farm Institute resulted in this dairy scene in which a Land Army recruit, modelled by an actual recruit called José Loosemore, learns to roll a milk-churn on the rim of its base.

By November 1940, after the first harvest which the Women's Land Army was largely responsible for bringing in, Men Stooking and Girls Learning to Stook had been painted, and WVS exploitation of that summer's excellent fruit crop was recognised in A Canning Demonstration. Among her November 1940 submissions to the WAAC was A Knitting Party, painted in the drawing room of the Dunbar house in Rochester and featuring some fifteen women, including Dunbar's mother Florence (the hatless woman, surreptitiously looking at her watch), knitting blankets or comforters in service colours.

In autumn 1940 Dunbar met Roger Folley (1912–2008) whom she would marry in August 1942. Folley, from Lancashire, was an agricultural economist who had worked and lived on site at Sparsholt Farm Institute as Costings Officer. As a Royal Auxiliary Air Force volunteer, he was called up to serve in the RAF in August 1939, receiving his Flying Officer commission in 1941.

Dunbar completed her hospital and nursing paintings in the winter of 1940–41. Hospital Train and Standing by on Train 21 are accounts of the emergency measures taken to relieve victims of the Blitz. A year later she completed St Thomas's Hospital in Evacuation Quarters, spending some weeks in Pyrford, Surrey, where the London hospital had been evacuated to. Dunbar's observation of hospital nursing activities is contained in a rectilinear mosaic of some 11 detailed vignettes.

A WAAC maintenance allowance gave Dunbar some freedom to travel and as her relationship with Folley grew, she often followed his various RAF postings. Folley's posting to a RAF training centre near Bristol resulted in several paintings of WLA activities in Usk, in nearby Monmouthshire, among them Sprout Picking, Monmouthshire.

Further training for Folley at RAF Charter Hall, Berwickshire, led Dunbar to the Scottish Borders, where she made the initial sketches for Potato Sorting, Berwick and two studies of WLA off-duty life, Women's Land Army Hostel and Land Army Girls going to Bed. The uniquely titled Singling Turnips is the fourth of her Berwickshire quartet. An Army Tailor and an ATS Tailoress (1943) captures a collective mood of deep concentration among her subjects as they sew new uniforms.

For the later years of the war Dunbar worked mainly from her studio in Rochester. Ministry of Defence authorisation to enter RAF South Cerney enabled the completion of Dunbar's only formal portrait in her WAAC work: Portrait of an Airwoman,(1944), now in the RAF Museum, Hendon. The subject, in Women's Auxiliary Air Force uniform, with a Good Conduct chevron on her left cuff, is unknown. Also in the RAF Museum, Hendon, is Section Officer Austen, Women's Auxiliary Air Force Meteorologist (1944), portrayed working at RAF Gravesend. By December of that year work was well advanced on A 1944 Pastoral: Land Girls Pruning at East Malling, an imaginatively composed study of apple tree pruning and pruning equipment at the East Malling Research Station, near Maidstone.

Strood, the trans-Medway suburb of Rochester, was the setting for The Queue at the Fish-Shop. Dunbar herself looks out of the painting, which was started in the spring of 1942 but not completed until 1944. The RAF officer cycling into the painting from the left is her husband Roger Folley, while her sister Jessie is the figure crossing the road. The ancient building housing the fish shop existed until the 1960s, when it was demolished to make room for a road widening scheme at a point called Angel Corner.

Dunbar's final WAAC painting, A Land Girl and the Bail Bull, was also completed, with much difficulty, in September 1945. The model for the Land Girl was her sister Jessie, who, although she modelled several times for Dunbar, is never seen full-face because of an eye disfigurement. Dunbar had sketched the dawn sky, for eventual inclusion in a painting, many years before in Kent. The 'bail' is a mobile milking shed, seen in the middle distance against the background of the Hampshire Downs.

During the war Dunbar continued painting and exhibiting privately. In the summer of 1942, she exhibited Kentish Landscape and Mrs Dunbar and the Snog at the Suffolk Street Galleries in London. The whereabouts of these paintings is currently unknown. More significantly, in 1943 she exhibited Joseph's Dreams, an imaginative diptych illustrating the Genesis story of Joseph dreaming that eleven stooks of corn and eleven stars, representing his eleven brothers, paid homage to him. The corn stooks are strongly reminiscent of the stooks in Dunbar's earlier painting, Men Stooking and Girls Learning to Stook. In both scenes Joseph is wearing his coat of many colours, and the dream-background is of fertile fields and well-cared-for plantations: Dunbar's convictions of the synergy between man and Nature are expressed once again.

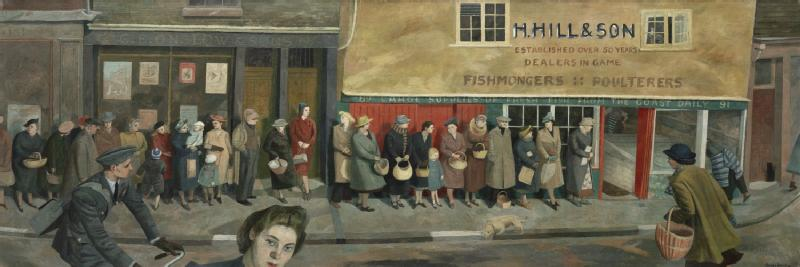
The Queue at the Fish-shop (Art.IWM ART LD 3987)

== The post-war period ==
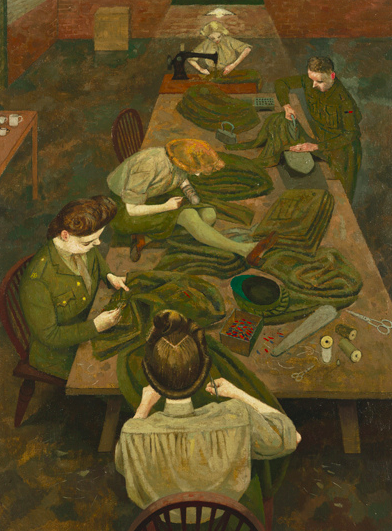
Army Tailor and ATS Tailoress (1943) (Art.IWM ART LD 3349)

At the end of the war, Dunbar and Folley lived in Long Compton, Warwickshire, next door to Folley's sister, Joan Duckworth, for some fifteen months. Despite makeshift studio facilities Dunbar completed her first portrait of her husband, Roger Folley in time for the winter exhibition at the Royal Academy Galleries. The first of two similar paintings entitled Dorset dates from this period. An allegorical painting featuring a recumbent woman looking out to sea, it was possibly inspired by a passage from Thomas Hardy's The Trumpet-Major.

In 1946 Dunbar was appointed to a part-time teaching post at the Oxford School of Art, as well as becoming a visiting teacher at the Ruskin School of Drawing and Fine Art. To be nearer Oxford, where Folley had also obtained a post in the University Agricultural Economics Research Institute, the couple moved from Long Compton to Enstone, Oxfordshire, in the spring of 1947. The Manor House at Enstone was their home for next three years.

At Enstone Dunbar completed her second portrait of her husband, which Folley renamed The Cerebrant when he presented it to Manchester Art Gallery in 2005. Dunbar's post at the Ruskin School led to a commission by Worcester College, Oxford, of The River in Eights Week, 1922 (sometimes known as Summer Eights), an unusual painting outside her regular canon, of which no other details survive as the painting was stolen in 1994. Other paintings from the period 1946–1950 include Oxford, an allegorical painting featuring a woman seated, with knees drawn up, lifting a dark blue canopy over the dreaming spires of the university cradled in her lap, and Mercatora, another allegorical study, of which Folley said '[The subject]...was really navigation...air navigation which she might have learned from me. [...] So that's probably what the spark, the germ might have been. Navigation...travel'. Joseph in the Pit (continuing her fascination with the Genesis saga), Flying Applepickers, Cottages at Long Compton, Woman with a Dog, Violas and Pansies, this last maybe an appreciative nod to Dunbar's mother Florence and her love of floral still lifes, exist as nothing more concrete than mere mentions, until further research reveals their whereabouts and appearance.

In 1950 Folley was appointed to the Department of Economics at Wye College, Kent. He and Dunbar left Enstone and took the lease of an isolated house some four miles from Wye. Here Dunbar held informal classes, maintaining her Oxford connections with an annual lecture at the Ruskin School. She now concentrated on portraiture and landscape. Returning to illustration, she contributed almost 100 pen and ink diagrams and illustrations to A Farm Dictionary (Evans Bros., London, 1953), written by another Wye College lecturer, Derek Chapman. A third, unidentified Joseph painting may come from this period, completing a trilogy. Dunbar now had the time to devote herself also to landscapes of her beloved Wealden countryside. The major canvas of her later years, Autumn and the Poet, developed slowly, incorporating its earliest origins in the countryside around Enstone.

By 1953 Dunbar was well enough established locally to mount her only solo exhibition, Evelyn Dunbar – Paintings and Drawings 1938–1953, at Withersdane Hall on the Wye campus. Of the 25 paintings exhibited, six were Dunbar's WAAC paintings loaned by the Imperial War Museum. Other paintings included Summer Eights, the Joseph trilogy, Dorset and the lush and opulent Wye from Olantigh.

== Alpha and Omega ==
In 1957 Bletchley Park Teacher Training College commissioned a mural from Dunbar. In August 1957, during the college's summer vacation, Dunbar worked on scaffolding and trestles in the college, preparing areas of wall for the large-scale realisation of the design that had been chosen from a selection Dunbar had submitted to Dora Cohen, the College Principal. Before Dunbar had advanced very far into the work she realised she had undertaken more than she could deliver. The originally proposed mural was replaced with two much smaller panels representing the college motto, Alpha and Omega, the first and the last. Alpha and Omega were painted on wood panels with both measuring 2' 7" x 4' 4": 81 x 132 cm, dimensions dictated by the space above the College Library doorways they were now destined to occupy. The panels are now in the possession of Oxford Brookes University, along with the original, unused, mural designs. Alpha and Omega are heavy with allegory and allusion. While the letter Omega (the Greek capital Ω) is represented by a background yew arch trained and clipped into this shape, the letter Alpha (the Greek lower-case α) is symbolised as a rudimentary bugle held by a boy of about ten.

Dunbar made something of a speciality of children's portraits in the years between 1954 and 1960. Such portraits were of the children of colleagues, friends and family. As far as is known her portraits were gifts to her subjects' families, and are thus held privately. Some are unfinished, like that of the elder of her two nephews by marriage, Christopher Campbell-Howes aged 12, in which the head is highly finished, but the upper body, arms and background are merely sketched. In the last few months of her life she also painted her younger nephew by marriage, Richard Campbell-Howes, in an unusual and striking full-length pose in which the subject is sitting on a Windsor chair reading a bound volume of the satirical magazine Punch.

== The last years ==
The last two paintings on easels in her studio at her death were Autumn and the Poet and Jacob's Dream. Autumn and the Poet had occupied Dunbar, on and off, over the previous ten years. Like other canvases which took her a long time to complete, e.g. Winter Garden, Autumn and the Poet achieves a high level of finish. The figure of the poet, half-seated on the ground, was modelled by Folley, while the fall of the drapes around the figure of Autumn was modelled by Folley's sister, with whom Dunbar enjoyed a close friendship. Autumn and the Poet was slightly smoke-damaged in a house fire in 2004, but was restored in time for the 2006 exhibition marking the centenary of Dunbar's birth.

== Legacy ==
On the evening of 12 May 1960, in the woods around Staple Farm, the Kent farmhouse in which she and Folley were then living, Dunbar suddenly collapsed and died. A post-mortem showed coronary atheroma to have been the cause of death.

At the time of her death, the storage shelves in a room adjoining the studio in Staple Farm, contained some 30–40 canvases. There were also numerous folios of drawings. Folley remarried in 1961, and in the interim Dunbar's remaining work was distributed among family and friends. It is sometimes supposed that Dunbar's post-war output was limited, and that her best work came from the pre-war and wartime periods. What evidence there is suggests that although her post-war work is unquantifiable, the quality of her work reached its maturity and peak. Dunbar worked continually, and there is nothing to suggest that at any time in her career did her output slacken, except for brief holiday periods, and even then, it was impossible for her to leave her sketch-book behind. Her oil paintings were her prime product, but she left behind many portfolios of water colours, drawings, pastels, sketches and other secondary work, most of which were not seen for many years after disappearing shortly after her death.

Dunbar's obituary in The Times concluded: 'Living a retired life in Kent, absorbed in country pursuits, Miss Dunbar did not often come before the public in mixed exhibitions, but her mural paintings and illustrations, with their peculiar authenticity of work inspired by the ruling passion, appealed strongly to those who knew it'.

In 1961 a memorial window in stained glass, designed by her friend and colleague John Ward, and now in the Old Hall, Wye College, was dedicated to Dunbar. The design incorporates Dunbar's paintings of flowers. It is inscribed 'In memory of Evelyn Dunbar. Painter and friend of the College 1906–1960.'

A Land Girl and the Bail Bull featured in the 2005 A Picture of Britain exhibition at Tate Britain. The first biography of Dunbar, written by Gill Clarke, was published in 2006 and was accompanied by an exhibition of the artist's work at the St Barbe Museum & Art Gallery in Hampshire. Several of her WAAC commissions featured in the Imperial War Museum's Women War Artists exhibition in 2011.

In 2013 Autumn and the Poet was featured on the Antiques Roadshow television programme where it was highly praised by Rupert Maas, and estimated to be worth £40,000 to £60,000. This prompted Ro Dunbar, who was married to Evelyn's nephew, to look into a tightly bound collection of artworks Roger Folley had left in an attic after Evelyn's death, which she thought would have been by Evelyn's mother, an amateur painter. They turned out to include more than 500 paintings and drawings by Evelyn. Another nephew had been tracking the contents of Evelyn's "lost studio", dismantled after her death, with its contents sold on or given away, and compiling a record of her paintings; the find doubled the number of her known works. The Pallant House Gallery in Chichester mounted an exhibition of the newly discovered pieces and other works, Evelyn Dunbar: The Lost Works, from October 2015 to February 2016.
