= Catharine Macaulay =

English historian, philosopher, and feminist (1731–1791)

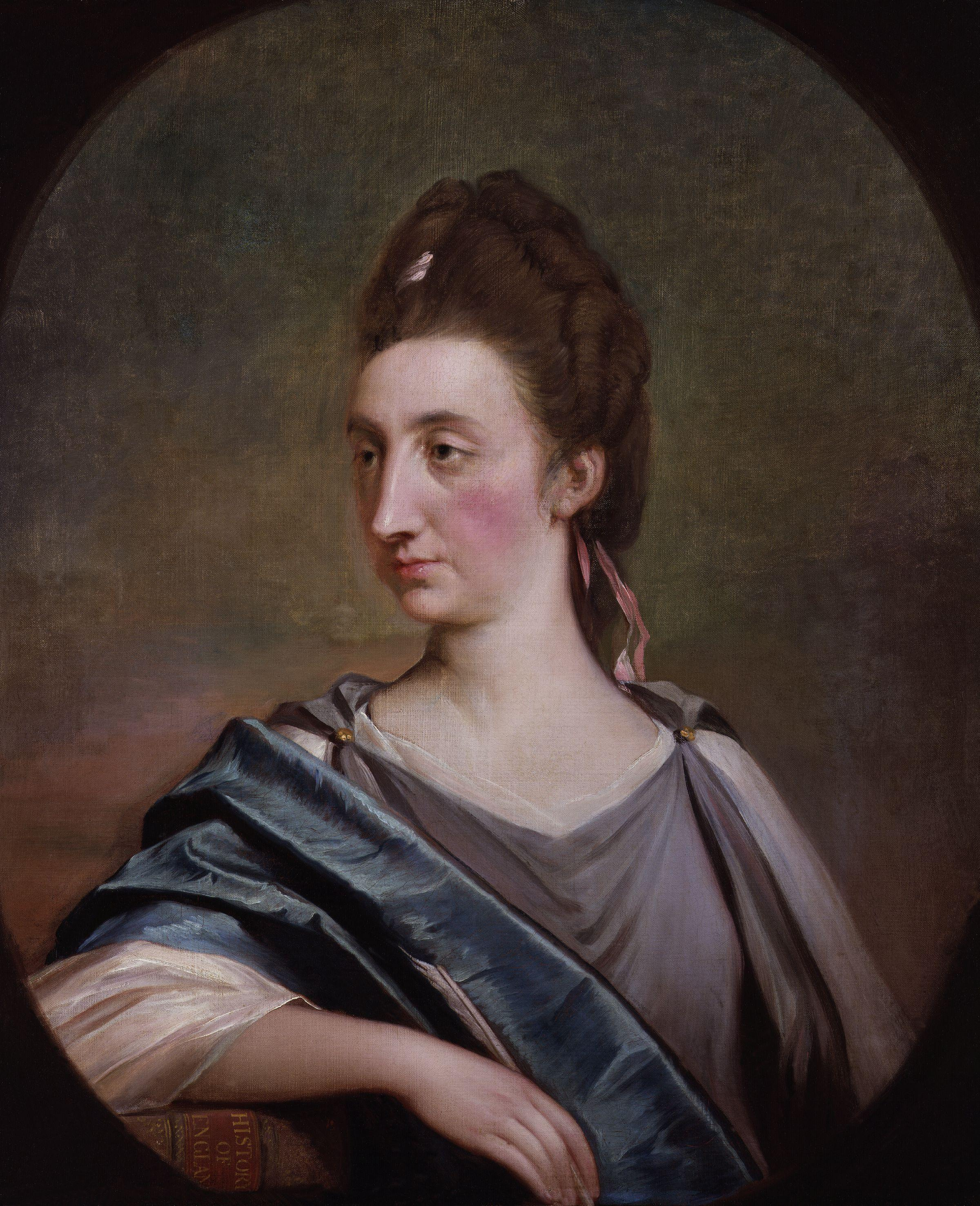
- Portrait by Robert Edge Pine, c. 1774
- Born: Catharine Sawbridge; 23 March 1731; Olantigh, Wye, Kent, England
- Died: 22 June 1791 (aged 60); Binfield, Berkshire, England
- Resting place: All Saints' Church, Binfield; 51°26′32.65″N 0°47′6.53″W
- Occupations: Historian, political theorist, author
- Known for: Writing on the history of England, early feminism, political activism
- Notable work: The History of England from the Accession of James I to that of the Brunswick Line (1763–1783)
- Spouses: George Macaulay (1760–1766, his death); William Graham (1778–1791, her death)
- Parents: John Sawbridge (1699–1762); Elizabeth Wanley (died 1733)

Catharine Macaulay (née Sawbridge, later Graham; 23 March 1731 – 22 June 1791) was an English historian. She was the first Englishwoman to become a published historian and during her lifetime the world's only published female historian. Macaulay was the first English radical to visit America after independence, staying there from 15 July 1784 to 17 July 1785. Her visit included a visit to Mount Vernon where she met with George Washington. Macaulay's most prominent work was an eight-volume Whig history of England in which she argued that the people have the right to overthrow their monarch for their own natural rights.

== Life ==
Catharine Macaulay (née Sawbridge) was born in Olantigh, Wye, Kent. She was the daughter of John Sawbridge (1699–1762) and Elizabeth Wanley (died 1733) of Olantigh. Sawbridge was a landed proprietor from Wye, Kent, whose ancestors were Warwickshire yeomanry. Catherine's grandfather was a well-known and wealthy man who left her property, located at Olantigh in Kent. Her grandfather eventually ruined his reputation and lost much of what he had.

Macaulay was educated privately at home by a governess. This governess was not able to meet all of Macaulay's interests and curiosity and Macaulay read and developed her skills on her own.

In the first volume of her History of England, Macaulay claimed that from an early age she was a prolific reader, in particular of "those histories which exhibit liberty in its most exalted state in the annals of the Roman and Greek Republics… [from childhood] liberty became the object of a secondary worship".

However this account is at odds with what she told her friend Benjamin Rush, to whom she described herself as "a thoughtless girl till she was twenty, at which time she contracted a taste for books and knowledge by reading an odd volume of some history, which she picked up in a window of her father's house". She also told Caleb Fleming that she knew neither Latin nor Greek.

Little is known about her early life. In 1757, a Latin and Greek scholar, Elizabeth Carter, visited a function at Canterbury where she met Macaulay, then 26 years old. In a letter to a friend, Carter described Macaulay as a "very sensible and agreeable woman, and much more deeply learned than beseems a fine lady; but between the Spartan laws, the Roman politics, the philosophy of Epicurus, and the wit of St. Evremond, she seems to have formed a most extraordinary system".

On 20 June 1760 she married a Scottish physician, Dr. George Macaulay (1716–1766), and they lived at St James's Place, London. They remained married for six years until his death in 1766. They had one child together, Catharine Sophia. With Dr. Macaulay's encouragement, Macaulay began to write her history of England. Her first volume was published in 1763. Nothing was published from 1768-1771. Macaulay moved to Bath in 1774. At age 47, she married her second husband, William Graham (then 21 years old), on 14 November 1778 The marriage caused some scandal but seemed to be a happy marriage despite outside opinions. Together they toured the United States and met with George Washington at Mount Vernon.

The second marriage coincided with the publication of the first volume of The History of England from the Revolution to the Present Time, in a Series of Letters to the Reverend Doctor Wilson (1778) in which she argued that the English Civil War had not gone far enough to eliminate the prerogatives of the crown. Her arguments against monarchy challenged moderate elements in the Whig party. Macaulay insisted that the civil war is a defense of the rights of the people against monarchs.

According to Mary Hays, Macaulay "had been furnished by general Washington with many materials" for a history of the American Revolution but that "she was, by the infirm state of her health" stopped from doing so. Macaulay wrote to the American writer Mercy Otis Warren in 1787: "Tho' the History of your late glorious revolution is what I should certainly undertake were I again young, yet as things are I must for many reasons decline such a task".

She later lived in Binfield, Berkshire. She died in Binfield in Berkshire on 22 June 1791 and was buried in All Saints' parish church there.

== The History of England ==
"There was a Macaulay's History of England long before Lord Macaulay's was heard of; and in its day a famous history it was."

— Robert Chambers, The Book of Days. Volume I (1864), p. 810.

Between 1763 and 1783 Macaulay wrote, in eight volumes, The History of England from the Accession of James I to that of the Brunswick Line. However, when completing the last three volumes she realised she would not reach 1714 and so changed the title to The History of England from the Accession of James I to the Revolution. Being practically unknown before the publication of the first volume, overnight she became "the Celebrated Mrs. Macaulay". She was the first Englishwoman to become an historian and during her lifetime the world's only published female historian.

The History is a political history of the seventeenth century. The first and second volumes cover the years 1603–1641; volumes three and four cover 1642–1647; volume five covers 1648–1660; volumes six and seven cover 1660–1683 and the last volume spans 1683–1689. Macaulay chose this period because, as she wrote in the first volume, she wanted "to do justice...to the memory of our illustrious ancestors". She lamented that her contemporaries had forgotten that the privileges they enjoyed had been fought for by "men that, with the hazard and even the loss of their lives, attacked the formidable pretensions of the Stewart family, and set up the banners of liberty against a tyranny which had been established for a series of more than one hundred and fifty years".

She believed that the Anglo-Saxons had possessed freedom and equality with representative institutions but that these were lost at the Norman Conquest. The history of England, in Macaulay's view, was the story of the struggle of the English to regain their rights that were crushed by the "Norman yoke". She viewed the Commonwealth of England as "the brightest age that ever adorned the page of history...Never did the annals of Humanity furnish the example of a government, so newly established, so formidable to foreign states as was at this period of the English Commonwealth". The Long Parliament was "the most patriotic government that ever blessed the hopes and military exertions of a brave people". The Parliamentarian army's fighting "was not a trade of blood, but an exertion of principle, and obedience to the call of conscience, and their conduct was not only void of insolence but benevolent and humane".

Macaulay justified the execution of King Charles I by claiming that "Kings, the servants of the State, when they degenerated into tyrants, forfeited their right to government". Following the argument of John Milton's Defence of the People of England, she argued that "the oaths of allegiance were to be understood as conditionally binding, according to the observance of the oaths kings made to their people. And neither the laws of God nor nature were against the peoples laying aside Kings and Kingly government, and the adopting more convenient forms".

She was heavily critical of Oliver Cromwell, who she denounced as "the vain-glorious usurper" and as an "individual, no ways exalted above his brethren in any of those private endowments which constitute the true greatness of character, or excelling in any quality, but in the measure of a vain and wicked ambition". He was responsible for ending a "period of national glory...when England after so long a subjection to monarchical tyranny bad fair to out-do in the constitution of its government...every circumstance of glory, wisdom and happiness related of ancient or modern empires".

Her view of the Glorious Revolution of 1688 was critical. She acknowledged that the Revolution Settlement limited the power of the crown and had rejected "hereditary indefeasible right" in favour of "a contract with the people" as the basis of the monarchy's power. However, she also claimed that patriots had neglected "this fair opportunity to cut off all of the prerogatives of the crown", to which they had "justly imputed the calamities and injuries sustained by the nation". The Revolution Settlement had failed to "admit of any of those refinements and improvements, which the experience of mankind had enabled them to make in the science of political security".

Macaulay shared her fellow radicals' anti-Catholicism, writing in the chapter covering the Irish Rebellion of 1641 of the Papists' "never-ceasing attempts by every kind of means, to bring all things again to subjection to the Church of Rome; their avowed maxim that faith is not to be kept with heretics; their religious principles calculated for the support of despotic power, and inconsistent with the genius of a free constitution".

Throughout her History, Macaulay showed a concern for her subjects' moral character and conduct. Self-interest was in her eyes the worst fault a king or politician was capable of. She criticised "their apparent devotion to politics for personal gain rather than for the advancement of liberty". Her approach was a moralising one as she believed that only a virtuous people could create a republic.

Whigs welcomed the first volumes of the History as a Whig answer to David Hume's "Tory" History of England. However, in 1768, relations between her and the Whigs cooled. Volume four of the history was published; this dealt with the trial and execution of Charles I. Macaulay expressed the view that Charles's execution was justified, praised the Commonwealth of England and revealed republican sympathies. This caused her to be abandoned by the Rockingham Whigs.

Thomas Hollis recorded in his diary (30 November 1763) that "the history is honestly written, and with considerable ability and spirit; and is full of the freest, noblest, sentiments of Liberty". Horace Walpole wrote to William Mason, quoting with approval Thomas Gray's opinion that it was the "most sensible, unaffected and best history of England that we have had yet".

Early in 1769, Horace Walpole recorded dining with "the famous Mrs. Macaulay": "She is one of the sights that all foreigners are carried to see". However, Walpole later changed his opinion: "The female historian as partial to the cause of liberty as bigots to the Church and royalists to tyranny, exerted manly strength with the gravity of a philosopher. Too prejudiced to dive into causes, she imputes everything to tyrannic views, nothing to passions, weakness, error, prejudice, and still less to what operates oftenest and her ignorance of which qualified her less for a historian—to accident and little motives".

William Pitt praised the History in the House of Commons and denounced Hume's Tory bias. Also approving were Joseph Priestley and John Wilkes. Around 1770, Lord Lyttelton wrote that Macaulay was "a very prodigy", with portraits of her "on every print-seller's counter". There was a Derby figure of porcelain made of her and one of Patience Wright's first life-sized wax figures was of Macaulay. James Burgh wrote in 1774 that Macaulay wrote "for the purpose of inculcating on the people of Britain the love of liberty and their country". The French statesmen Mirabeau, Jacques Pierre Brissot and the Marquis de Condorcet admired the History as a corrective to Hume. In 1798, the French Ministry of the Interior recommended the History in a list of works suitable for school prizes.

Her fame came to an end in 1778 when she remarried, with many of her friends and supporters dropping her. She henceforth disappeared into obscurity, only occasionally re-emerging into the public eye.

Macaulay also wished to write a History of England from the Revolution to the Present Time, however only the first volume (covering 1688–1733) was completed.

== Politics ==
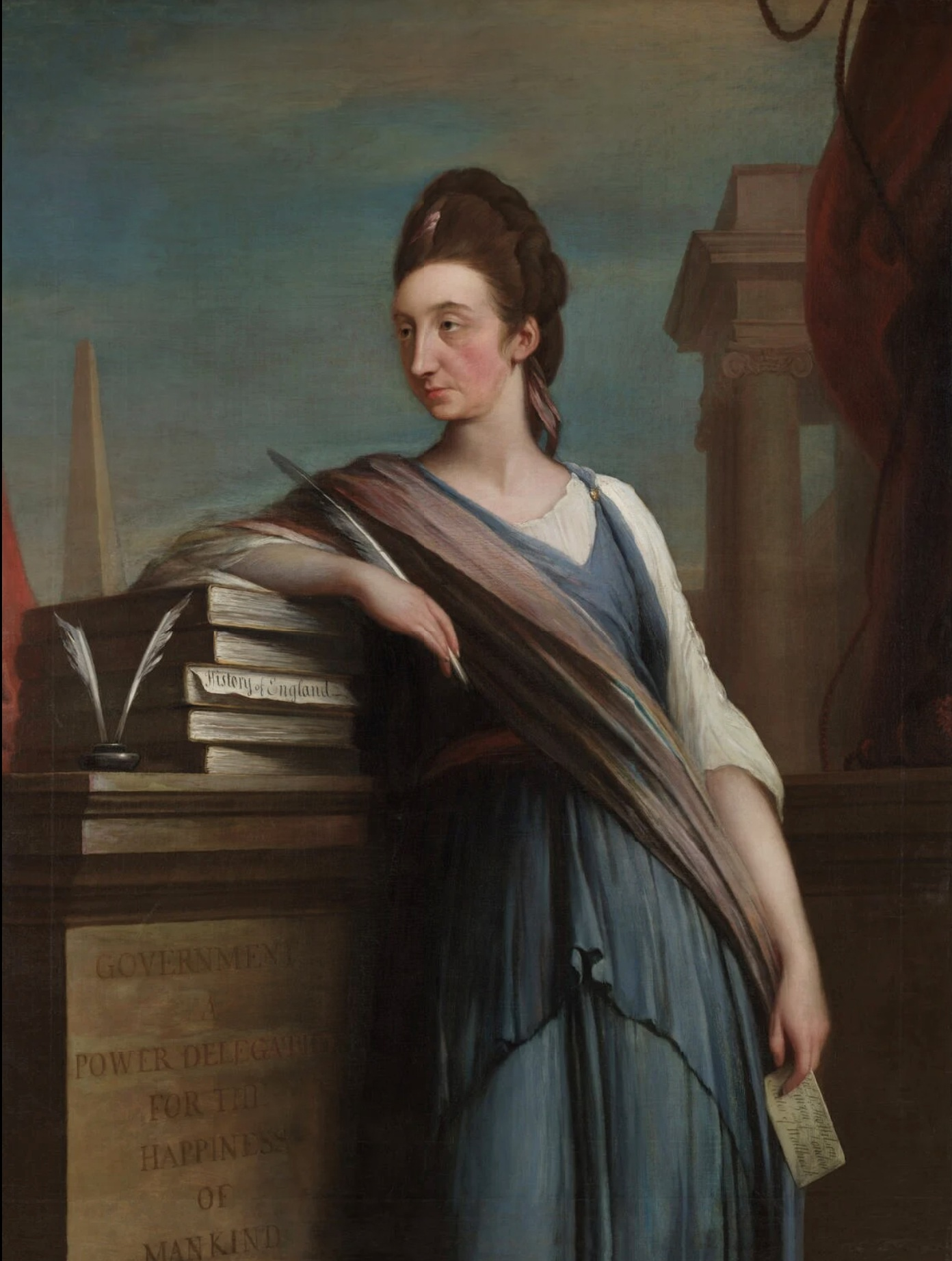
c. 1775 portrait of Macaulay by Robert Edge Pine

Macaulay was associated with two political groups in the 1760s and 1770s: the Real Whigs and the Wilkites. She was also sympathetic with the cause of the American Colonists. However, she was more interested in polemic than everyday strategy. She was a supporter of John Wilkes during the Wilkesite controversy of the 1760s and closely associated with the radical Society for the Supporters of the Bill of Rights. She believed that as long as the monarch does not threaten freedom, stays aligned with the constitution and is able to fairly enforce laws to the people, there is no reason to think it is incompatible with liberty.

The Tory Samuel Johnson was a critic of her politics:

Sir, there is one Mrs. Macaulay in this town, a great republican. One day when I was at her house, I put on a very grave countenance, and said to her, "Madam, I am now become a convert to your way of thinking. I am convinced that all mankind are upon an equal footing; and to give you an unquestionable proof, Madam, that I am in earnest, here is a very sensible, civil, well-behaved fellow-citizen, your footman; I desire that he may be allowed to sit down and dine with us." I thus, Sir, shewed her the absurdity of the levelling doctrine. She has never liked me since. Sir, your levellers wish to level down as far as themselves; but they cannot bear levelling up to themselves. They would all have some people under them; why not then have some people above them?

In 1790, Macaulay claimed she was only talking about political inequality, she insisted she was not "arguing against that inequality of property which must more or less take place in all societies".

Macaulay opposed Catholic emancipation, criticising in 1768 those "who pretend to be friends of Liberty and (from an affectation of a liberal way of thinking) would tolerate Papists". She regarded the people of Corsica as being "under Popish Superstition" and recommended the works of Milton to enlighten them.

She supported the exiled Corsican Pasquale Paoli. In her Sketch of a Democratical Form of Government, she advocated a two chamber state (Senate and People). She wrote that "The second order is necessary because ... without the people have authority enough to be thus classed, there can be no liberty". The people should have the right to appeal a court's decision to the Senate and the People. Also, there should be a rotation of all public offices to prevent corruption. An agrarian law was needed to limit the amount of land an individual could inherit to prevent the formation of an aristocracy. She claimed that there needed to be "an unrestrained power lodged in some person, capable of the arduous task of settling such a government" and claimed that this should be Paoli. However, Paoli distanced himself from Macaulay as his sole concern was sustaining English support for Corsica rather than intervening in domestic politics.

Macaulay attacked Edmund Burke's Thoughts on the Cause of the Present Discontents. She wrote that it contained "a poison sufficient to destroy all the little virtue and understanding of sound policy which is left in the nation", motivated by "the corrupt principle of self-interest" of "Aristocratic faction and party" whose over-riding aim was a return to power. Burke, in her estimation, had failed to see that the problem lay in the corruption which had its origins in the Glorious Revolution. Parliament was reduced to "a mere instrument of regal administration" rather than controlling the executive. Macaulay advocated a system of rotation for MPs and "a more extended and equal power of election".

None of Macaulay's historical or political works were concerned with women's rights. In her support for parliamentary reform, she did not envisage granting the vote to women. She was heavily influenced by the works of James Harrington, especially his belief that property was the foundation of political power.

During a visit to France in 1774, she dined with Turgot, who enquired whether she wanted to see the Palace of Versailles. She replied that "I have no desire to see the residence of the tyrants, I haven't yet seen that of the Georges".

Her last work was a pamphlet reply to Burke's Reflections on the Revolution in France (1790). She wrote that it was right that the French had not replaced Louis XVI as this would have complicated their task to ensure liberty. She replied to Burke's lament that the age of chivalry was gone by claiming that society should be freed from "false notions of honour" which were nothing more than "methodized sentimental barbarism".

Whereas Burke supported the inherited rights of Englishmen rather than the abstract rights of man, Macaulay claimed that Burke's theory of rights as gifts of monarchs meant that monarchs could just as easily take away the rights they had granted. Only by claiming them as natural rights could they be secured. The "boasted birthright of an Englishman" she had always thought of as "an arrogant pretension" because it suggested "a kind of exclusion to the rest of mankind from the same privileges".

== Feminism ==
Macaulay is a central figure in the history of women's political thought. Like English philosopher and feminist Mary Astell (1666-1731), Macaulay's work anticipated ideas that would later be associated with feminist political theory such as concerns about women, consent, and the social contract. In her Loose Remarks on Certain Positions to be found in Mr. Hobbes's 'Philosophical Rudiments of Government and Society' (1767), Macaulay criticized Thomas Hobbes's construction of patriarchy and paternal right. Macaulay’s ideas contradicted those of Hobbes and Rousseau because she focused more on reason and virtue rather than self-interest. Although predominantly a historian, Macaulay developed her own theory of politics. She criticized absolute monarchs and despotic regimes—and the patriarchy that she believed made both possible. She outlined elements of her own form of popular or republican government. Interest in her feminism has led scholars to focus on her critique of patriarchy and her political theory (beyond her works of history). Scholars have also noted the relationship between her feminism and religious ideas.

Macaulay believed that education was one of the most important factors in forming a society. She argued that men and women share the same natural rights and, therefore, should receive the same kind of education. In addition, scholars have noted Macaulay's impact on early feminist Mary Wollstonecraft, author of A Vindication of the Rights of Woman (1792). Both Macaulay and Wollstonecraft wrote on themes such as education, freedom as independence, equality, virtue, reputation, injustice, history, and false ideas. Wollstonecraft recognized the impact when she wrote to Macaulay: "You are the only female writer who I coincide in opinion with respecting the rank our sex ought to endeavour to attain in the world. I respect Mrs Macaulay Graham because she contends for laurels while most of her sex only seek for flowers."

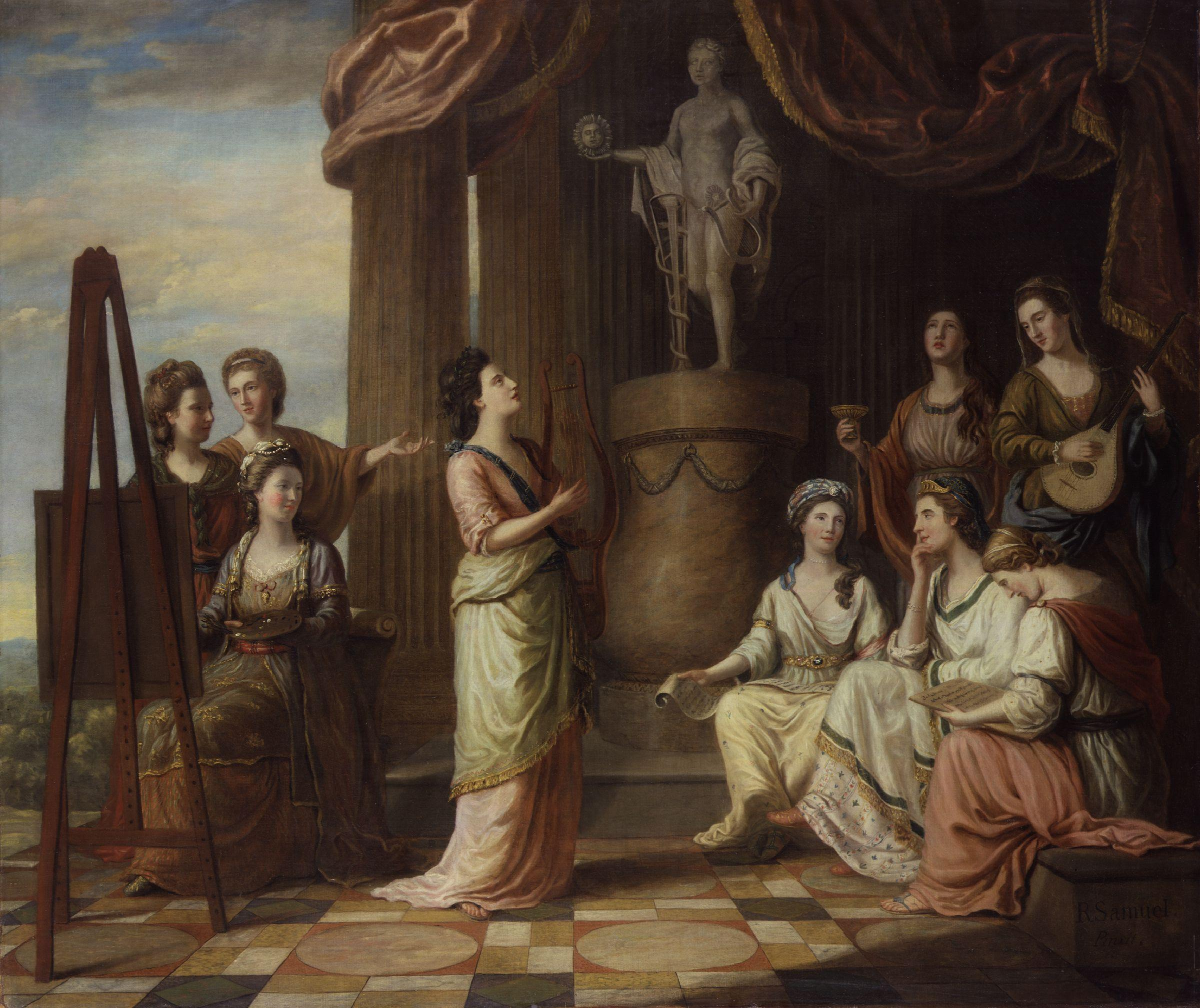
1778 painting of the Blue Stockings Society, showing Macaulay (seated, third from right)

Macaulay's work challenged the political and legal world of her time. British law regarding marriages recognised coverture: a husband "covered" the legal identity of a married woman so that, by a "fiction of the law," marriage joined husband and wife into one legal person represented solely by the husband. As the head of household, the husband controlled his wife's financial and bodily autonomy as well as their children. Coverture began in England in the 12th century and continued to influence legal thinking in common law countries into the 20th century. Macaulay's political works interrogated the subordination of women in British society and law.

== Treatise on the Immutability of Moral Truth ==
She was a lifelong member of the Church of England, although her apparent free expression of heterodox religious opinions shocked some of her contemporaries and led to accusations of infidelity. In her Treatise she wrote that God was "omnipotent in the largest sense of the word, and that his works and commands" were "founded in righteousness and not in mere will". The Treatise revealed her optimism about humanity and the belief in the attainment of perfection in individuals and society. She also claimed that reason, without faith, was insufficient and wrote of the need for the Church to concentrate "on the practical doctrines of the Christian religion", such as man's God-given powers of bettering his own condition and reducing evil. She also rejected the idea of an inherent human nature: "There is not a virtue or a vice that belongs to humanity, which we do not make ourselves".

Macaulay believed in the afterlife. When she became dangerously ill in 1777 in Paris, she told a friend that death did not scare her for it was but "a short separation between virtuous friends" after which they would be reunited "in a more perfect state".

== Letters on Education ==
She wrote in 1790 in her Letters on Education that the apparent weakness of women was due to their mis-education—and Mary Wollstonecraft wrote something similar two years later in A Vindication of the Rights of Woman. Macaulay's writings set up Wollstonecraft to structure her following pieces and influenced her writing.

In the Letters she wrote "the thoughts of a fatherless universe, and a set of beings let loose by chance or fate on one another, without other law than power dictates and opportunity gives a right to exact, chills the sensibility of the feeling mind into indifference and despair".

== American visit ==
Macaulay wrote pamphlets criticizing the policy of the British Government in the lead up to the Revolution and she was personally associated with many leading figures among the American Revolutionaries. She was the first English radical to visit America after independence, staying there from 15 July 1784 to 17 July 1785. Macaulay visited siblings James Otis and Mercy Otis Warren. Mercy wrote afterwards that Macaulay was "a lady whose Resources of knowledge seem to be almost inexhaustible" and wrote to John Adams that she was "a Lady of most Extraordinary talent, a Commanding Genius and Brilliance of thought". According to Mercy's biographer, Macaulay had "a more profound influence on Mercy than had any other woman of her era". She then visited New York and met Richard Henry Lee, who afterwards thanked Samuel Adams for introducing him to "this excellent Lady". Upon the recommendation of Lee and Henry Knox, Macaulay stayed at Mount Vernon with George Washington and his family. Afterwards, Washington wrote to Lee of his pleasure at meeting "a Lady ... whose principles are so much and so justly admired by the friends of liberty and mankind".

Macaulay wrote to George Washington on 30 October 1789 in which she offered analysis of the American Revolution and Washington responded 9 January 1790. During this period she corresponded with John Adams, Abigail Adams, James Otis, Mercy Otis Warren, Benjamin Franklin and Sarah Prince-Gill, among numerous other colonists.

== Works ==
- The History of England from the Accession of James I to that of the Brunswick Line:
  - Volume I (1763).
  - Volume II (1765).
  - Volume III (1767).
  - Volume IV (1768).
  - Volume V (1771).
  - Volume VI (1781).
  - Volume VII (1781).
  - Volume VIII (1783).
- Loose Remarks on Certain Positions to be found in Mr. Hobbes's 'Philosophical Rudiments of Government and Society', with a Short Sketch of a Democratical Form of Government, In a Letter to Signor Paoli (1767).
- Observations on a Pamphlet entitled 'Thoughts on the Cause of the Present Discontents' (1770).
- A Modest Plea for the Property of Copyright (1774).
- An Address to the People of England, Scotland and Ireland on the Present Important Crisis of Affairs (1775).
- The History of England from the Revolution to the Present Time in a Series of Letters to a Friend. Volume I (1778).
- Treatise on the Immutability of Moral Truth (1783).
- Letters on Education with Observations on Religions and Metaphysical Subjects (1790).
- Observations on the Reflections of the Rt. Hon. Edmund Burke, on the Revolution in France (1790).
