= Charles Mahoney (artist) =

English painter (1903–1968)

- Born: 18 November 1903; Lambeth, London, England
- Died: 11 May 1968 (aged 64); London, England
- Education: Beckenham College of Art; Royal College of Art
- Known for: Art teacher and painter

Cyril Mahoney, known as Charles Mahoney, RA (18 November 1903 – 11 May 1968) was a British artist and teacher, known for his large-scale mural work.

== Biography ==
Mahoney was born in Lambeth, London and attended Beckenham College of Art before studying at the Royal College of Art, RCA, from 1922 to 1926. At the RCA his fellow students included Edward Bawden and Barnett Freedman, who gave him the nickname Charles which Mahoney adopted for his professional career. In 1928, Mahoney accepted a teaching post at the RCA and would continue to work there until 1953. During this period he led the Colleges' composition class and later the Mural Room. Mahoney and a group of current and former students, which included Evelyn Dunbar and Mildred Eldridge, were commissioned to decorate the assembly hall of Brockley County School for Boys, in south London with a series of murals illustrating Aesop's fables, that were unveiled in 1936. Other mural commissions completed by Mahoney included The Pleasures of Life for the concert hall at Morley College, which stood alongside the murals Bawden and Eric Ravilious were creating there for the college refectory, two works at the Festival of Britain in 1951 and a mural for the Lady Chapel at Campion Hall in Oxford. The Morley College murals were unveiled by Stanley Baldwin in 1930 but were destroyed by bombing during the Second World War. In 1937, Mahoney wrote the book Gardeners' Choice which was illustrated by Dunbar.

Mahoney married the calligrapher, and fellow RCA tutor, Dorothy Bishop in 1941, while the RCA was evacuated to Ambleside, and from 1945 the couple lived in Wrotham in Kent. Mahoney, who was a skilled botanist, often depicted the gardens there in his drawings.

From 1954 to 1963, Mahoney taught at the Byam Shaw School of Art and from 1961 until 1968 at the Royal Academy Schools. He exhibited with the New English Art Club from 1936 and at the Royal Academy from 1960. Mahoney was elected an associate member of the Royal Academy in 1961 and elected a full Academician in 1968. A memorial exhibition for him was held at the Ashmolean Museum in 1975 and, during 1999 and 2000, the Harris Museum and Art Gallery in Preston hosted a large display of his work which also toured. Works by Mahoney also featured in the 2005 Tate Britain exhibition, The Art of the Garden.
