= Arthur Willink =

Arthur Willink (1850-1913) was a nineteenth-century British theologian and clergyman.

== Biography ==
His most notable work is The World of the Unseen, a piece in which he argues that the universe consists of three parallel planes: the earth, heaven, and hell. God, Willink argues, exists on a complete separate, infinite-dimensional space completely removed from these three planes.

In The World of the Unseen, he wrote:

"This emphasizes very strongly what has been said about the Omniscience of God. For He, dwelling in the Highest Space of all, not only has this perfect view of all the constituents of our being, but also is most infinitely near to every point and particle of our whole constitution. So that in the most strictly physical sense it is true that in Him we live and move and have our being.

Willink was one of the earliest philosophers to postulate that the world exists in more than the three dimensions we are used to, thus setting the stage for the development of hyperspace theories.

He was curate in charge at Wye Church from 1895 to 1896.

== Works ==
- Not Death's Dark Night: An Hour's Communion With The Dead (1892)
- The World of the Unseen: An Essay on the Relation of Higher Space to Things Eternal (1893)
