= Life Is a Dance =

Life is a Dance may refer to:

== Music ==
=== Albums ===
- Life's a Dance, album by John Michael Montgomery
- Life Is a Dance: The Remix Project Chaka Khan

=== Songs ===
- "Life's a Dance" (song), song by John Michael Montgomery
- "Life Is a Dance", a song by Chaka Khan, Chaka Khan discography

== See also ==
- The Dance of Life (disambiguation)
- "Zindagi Meri Dance Dance" (lit. 'My Life Is a Dance'), a Hindi song by Alisha Chinai and Vijay Benedict
