= Wye Racecourse =

British horse racing venue at Wye, Kent

- Location: Wye, Kent
- Coordinates: 51.187362°N 0.961555°E; 51.183106°N 0.926508°E
- Date opened: 29 May 1849
- Date closed: June 1975
- Notable races: Wye Centenary Chase; Wye Sweepstake

Wye Racecourse (29 May 1849 – June 1975) was a British horse racing venue at Wye, Kent. By 1878 it was about 600 yards (550 m) south of Wye railway station.

Wye Racecourse's inaugural 1849 meeting was held in Fanscombe Valley, an isolated coombe and natural amphitheatre directly north of Wye Crown, and 1 mile (1.6 km) as the crow flies from Wye village. Fanscombe Valley had formerly been a manor in the ownership of St Thomas' Hospital, Southwark. The meeting became a regular fixture of the flat racing calendar on Oak Leaf Day, 29 May coinciding with Wye Fair. A crowd of 20,000 was reportedly attracted in 1863, despite the difficult access, uphill walk and tiny, 1.75 miles (2.82 km) course. Accounts suggest a significant proportion of the crowd were more interested in free admission, hospitality and the fair maidens of Kent than horses.

By 1878, Wye's racing had moved to the National Hunt course on Harville Road. A platform was constructed for racegoers' trains at the south east of the present level crossing, and across the track from the new racecourse. Steeplechase meetings were held in September, January, March, and May. The last was in 1974, and the course closed permanently by June 1975. The Jockey Club had asked for improvements to camber on the bottom bend, and to the stands. The course was described as being less than one mile (1.6 km) around, and more suited to a greyhound track than a racecourse. It could not be entirely classed as the ideal preparation for a tilt at the Champion Hurdle. As of 2022, both racecourses are farmland.
