= Wye, Kent =

Village in Kent, England

Wye
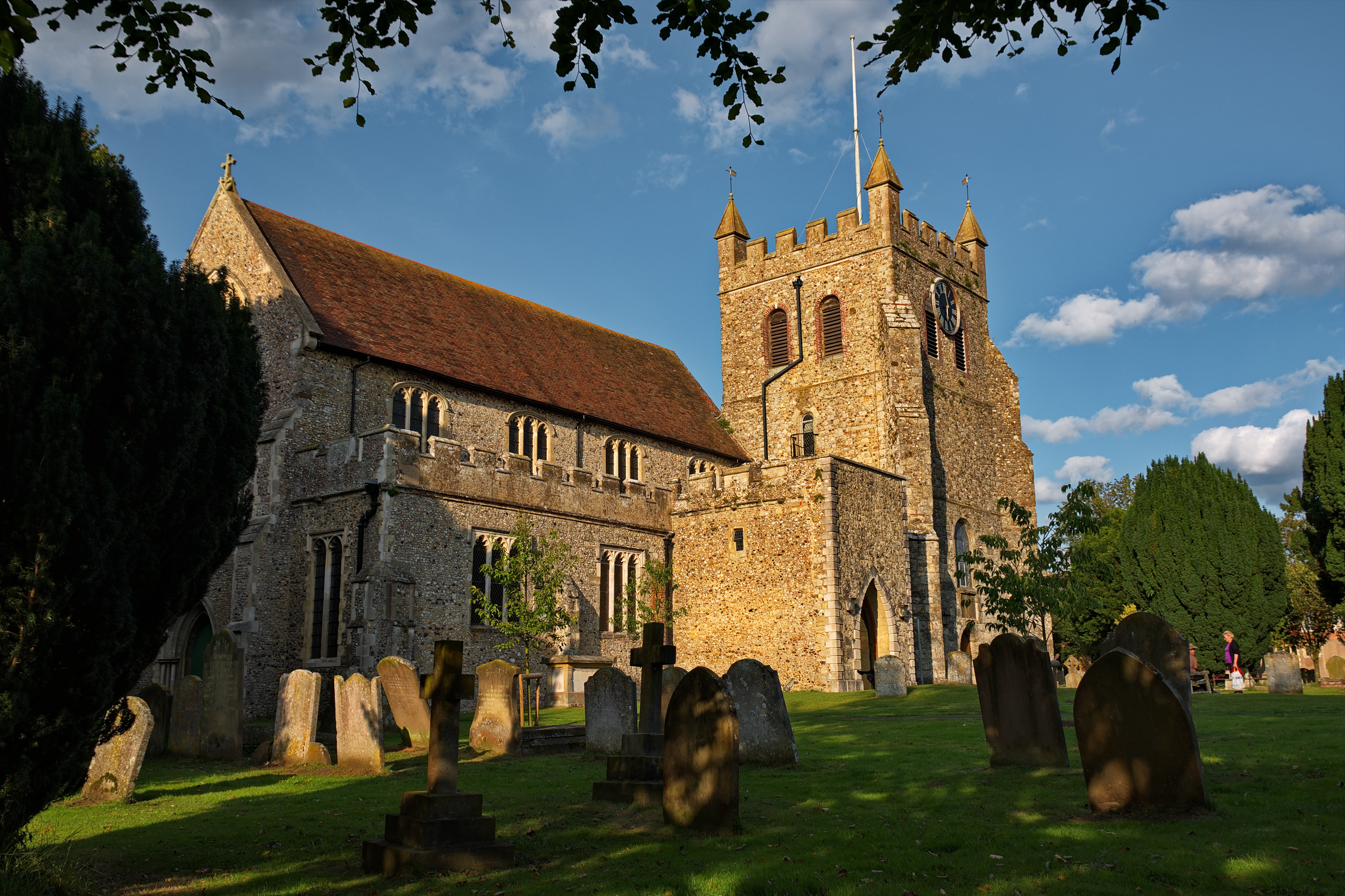
- St Gregory and St Martin's Church, Wye

- Location within Kent
- Area: 24.1 km^{2} (9.3 sq mi)
- Population: 2,063 (Built-up Area, 2021)
  - Density: 86/km^{2} (220/sq mi)
- OS grid reference: TR055466
- Civil parish: Wye with Hinxhill
- District: Ashford
- Shire county: Kent
- Region: South East
- Country: England
- Sovereign state: United Kingdom
- Post town: Ashford
- Postcode district: TN25
- Dialling code: 01233
- Police: Kent
- Fire: Kent
- Ambulance: South East Coast
- UK Parliament: Ashford

Wye is a village and former civil parish, now in the parish of Wye with Hinxhill, in the Ashford district, in Kent, England, 5 miles (8.0 km) from Ashford and 12 miles (19 km) from Canterbury. The Built-up Area had a population of 2,063 at the 2021 census.

It is the main settlement in the parish of Wye with Hinxhill. Hop varieties including Wye Challenger were bred at Wye College and named for the village. In 2013, Sunday Times readers voted Wye the third best place to live in the UK.

== History ==
The village's name comes from the Old English "Wēoh" meaning idol or shrine.

Wye may have been used for worship by the pre-Christian Angles.

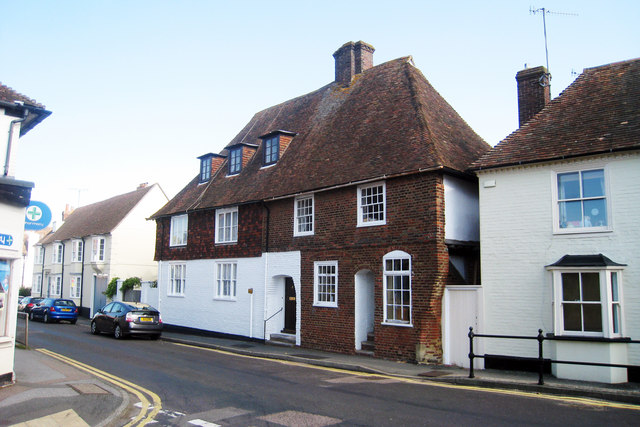
Bridge Street, 2009

Wye became an important communications centre because of a ford across the River Great Stour connecting with ancient trackways across the North Downs. Romans constructed a road between Canterbury and Hastings using the gap through the North Downs and there have been suggestions the straight Olantigh Road may have been built by them as a separate route from Wye to Canterbury on the east of the River Stour. Remains of an ironworks at the west bank of the river, from that period, have been found. By medieval times, Wye had a market and hosted the local hundred court.

In 1798, Hasted described Wye as:-

...a neat well-built town, consisting of two parallel and two cross streets, the whole unpaved. There is a large green in it, built round, on one side of which is the church and college close to it.

— Edward Hasted, 1798

Later in the 18th century a turnpike had bypassed the village on the west bank of the River Stour, which the A28 road still does today. Wye railway station was built for the South Eastern Railway line from Ashford to Margate and opened on 1 December 1846.

=== RAF Wye ===
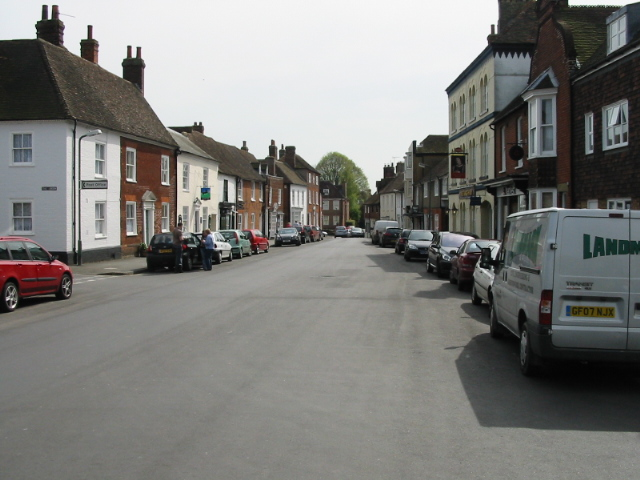
Church Street, 2008

During World War I the Royal Flying Corps established an unpaved aerodrome off Bramble Lane near Wye Railway Station. It became RAF Wye in 1918 but closed the following year. As of 2022, it is farmland.

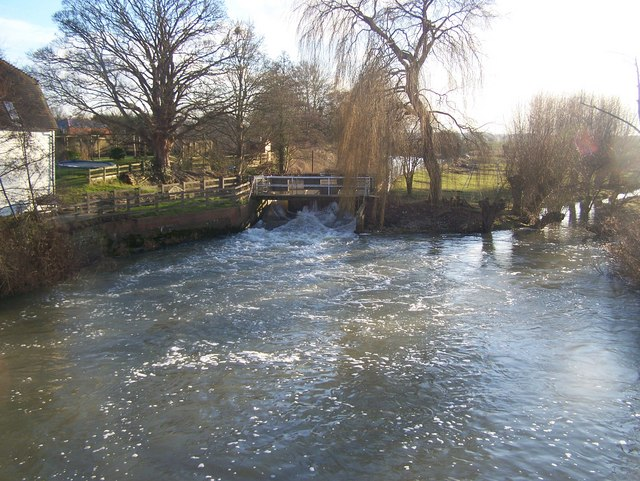
The Great Stour, 2009

=== Wye Racecourse ===
Wye Racecourse's inaugural 1849 meeting was held in Fanscombe Valley, an isolated coombe and natural amphitheatre directly north of Wye Crown, and 1 mile (1.6 km) as the crow flies from Wye village. Flat racing took place annually on Oak Leaf Day, 29 May coinciding with Wye Fair.

By 1878, Wye's racing had moved to the National Hunt course on Harville Road. Steeplechase meetings were held in September, January, March, and May until 1974, and the course closed permanently by June 1975. As of 2022, both former courses are farmland.

=== Wye Court ===
As early as the 6th century, Wye was a royal vill, and the royal court would have resided in the vicinity of Wye Court for part of the year. In the 13th century it was a Royal Manor whose Liberty extended as far as Hawkhurst. The Palace complex by then was at Wye Court.

Wye was important for being the first ford over the River Stour that travellers could cross on their route from the West Country to Dover.

In 1307, King Edward II spent Christmas at Wye Court between the death of his father King Edward I, and his own coronation the following February. The father had received his Seal from the Officer of State there. Young King Henry VI visited Wye Court in 1428 when Cardinal Kempe of Olantigh was his Lord Chancellor.

The Manor House at Wye Court was a large building, with a circular dungeon that was extant as late as the 19th century and known locally as the Lollard's Hole. In 1553, two Protestants were executed by burning in front of Wye Church. The disturbances and associated use of the dungeons may have led to that name.

Wye was not isolated from Wat Tyler's 1381 uprising or Jack Cade's rebellion of 1450. In the 15th century, church officials were ordered especially to address lollardy in Maidstone, Tenterden, Faverisham and Wy.

Queen Elizabeth I granted Wye Court to the Boleym related Hunsden family but by the time of King Charles I, ownership had passed to the Finches, a distant branch of the Earls of Winchilsea.

Following the 1572 lightning strike at Wye Church, yeoman farmer Roger Twysden of Wye Court provided timber for reconstruction of the tower. He became High Sheriff of Kent in 1599 but following a fire at his own home he moved from Wye Court to a family dwelling at Chelmington, and then Roydon Hall.

A 1648 Civil War skirmish involving Rich's men and cavaliers took place at the entrance to Wye Court on Olantigh Road. Accounts identify four casualties of the encounter being buried at Wye, and three others killed.

By 1732, Wye Court, along with other land near Wye at Harville, Coldharbour, Wye Downs and Naccolt had fallen into the ownership of miser, John "Vulture" Hopkins. Once his affairs had been unravelled the properties were inherited by Benjamin Bond Hopkins (1745–1794). He sold them to John Sawbridge of Olantigh whose son owned Wye Court by 1798.

Wye Court formerly extended beyond the present day farm, including land to Churchfield Way. Wye College purchased parts of Wye Court for expansion along Olantigh Road in 1925. In 1917, Wye Church agreed to purchase a parcel of Wye Court, to extend its graveyard, from Wanley Elias Sawbridge Erle-Drax, a descendant of John Sawbridge. The Long family purchased their present Wye Court farm and former racecourse on Harville Road in 1925.

Entomologist Frederick Theobald lived at Wye Court until he died in 1930. He had moved to Wye to teach at the South Eastern Agricultural College when it opened in 1894. Apart from his work at the college he spent much of his time curating economic zoology and mosquito collections at the British Museum, and ceased lecturing from 1920 in favour of agricultural extension. Theobald's research on mosquitos and tropical sanitation earned him international recognition including the Order of Osmanieh and Mary Kingsley Medal.

In September 1940, a Spitfire of No 19 Squadron from RAF Duxford crashed at Wye Court injuring the pilot and writing the aircraft off. The crash site was excavated in 1974 by the RAF Museum.

=== Wye College ===
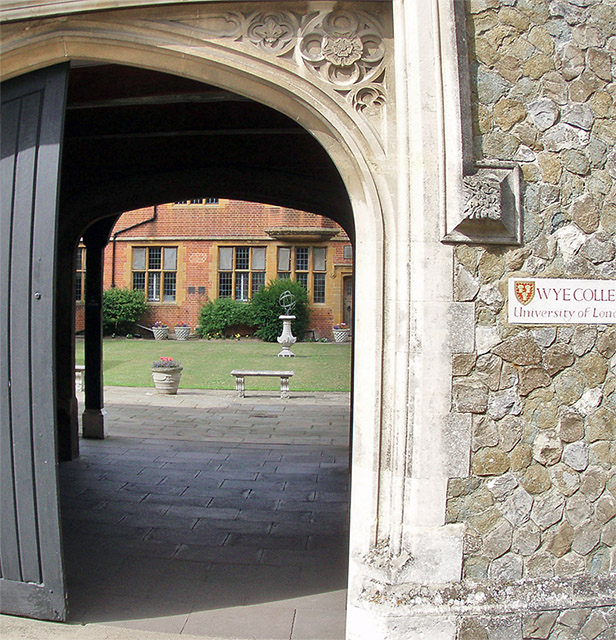
Wye College, 2009

Wye College was founded in 1447 as a chantry by Cardinal Kempe. From 1627, a grammar and charity school operated from the premises. In 1894 the buildings re-opened as the South Eastern Agricultural College, offering University of London degrees from 1898, and in 1948 incorporated as Wye College. It merged with Imperial College in 2000 but the campus was progressively closed between 2005 and 2009.

=== Imperial College scheme ===
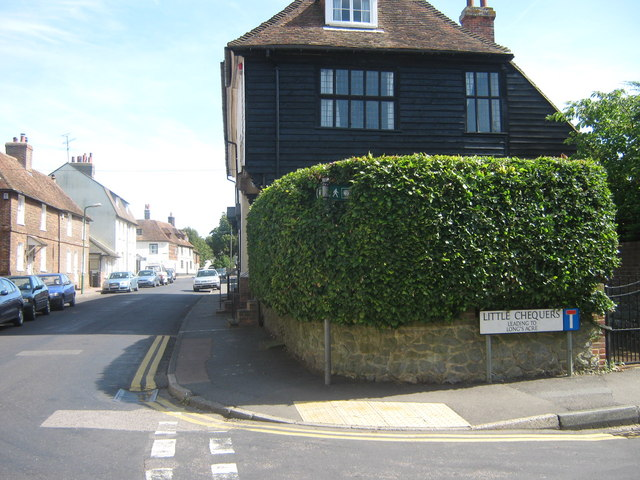
Bridge Street, 2009

In 2005, Imperial College promoted a controversial scheme to develop Wye College as a centre for renewable fuel research / production, and to build 4,000 house in the Kent Downs.The plan was seen as a test case for other attempts to build on Areas of Outstanding Natural Beauty. In 2006, Ashford Borough Council withdrew support, and Imperial College abandoned its plans. Campaigners hailed the decision to preserve the status of protected areas, and Wye village.

== Landscape ==
Wye stands in the Kent Downs Area of Outstanding Natural Beauty, on the Great Stour at the point where it cuts through the North Downs between Ashford and Canterbury. The village is overlooked by the Wye Downs, an area of chalk downland and woodland within the Wye and Crundale Downs SSSI that includes the Devil's Kneading Trough and other coombes formed by periglacial action.

== Culture and community ==
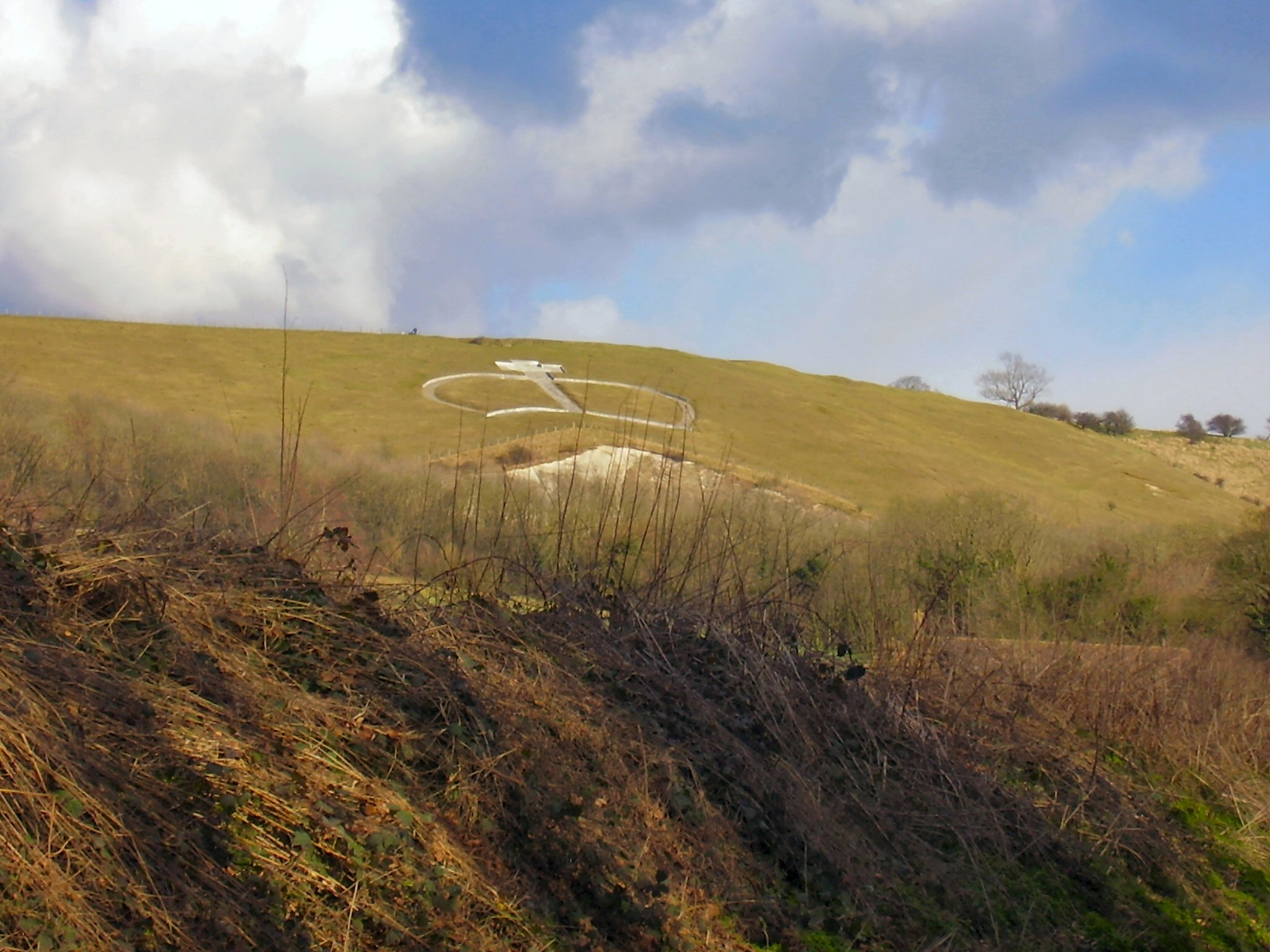
Wye Crown

=== Wye Farmers Market ===
51.18329°N 0.93801°E

A farmers' market, founded by former Wye College student and environmentalist Richard Boden, is held by The Green in Wye on the first and third Saturday of every month. There are typically 15 vendors. During COVID-19 restrictions the market operated a virtual shop.

=== Wye Village Hall ===
51.18379°N 0.932162°E

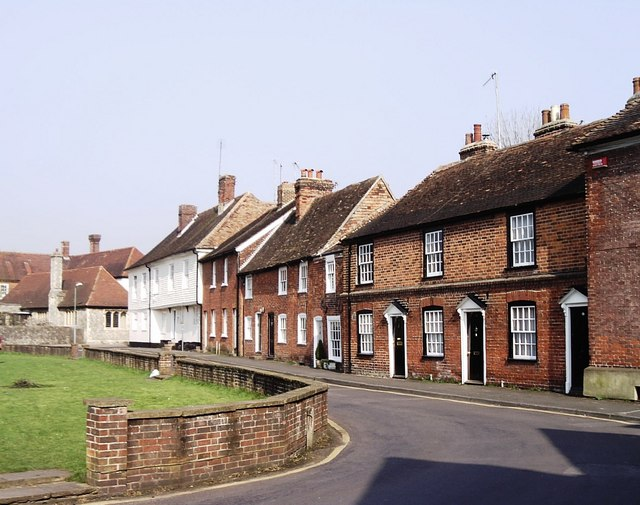
The Green, 2007

Wye Village Hall on Bridge Street was extensively refurbished between 2014 and 2019. There are three function rooms of which the largest can accommodate 180 people.

=== Wye Library ===
51.18227°N 0.93728°E

Wye Library is at the top of Bridge Street.

=== Wye Church ===
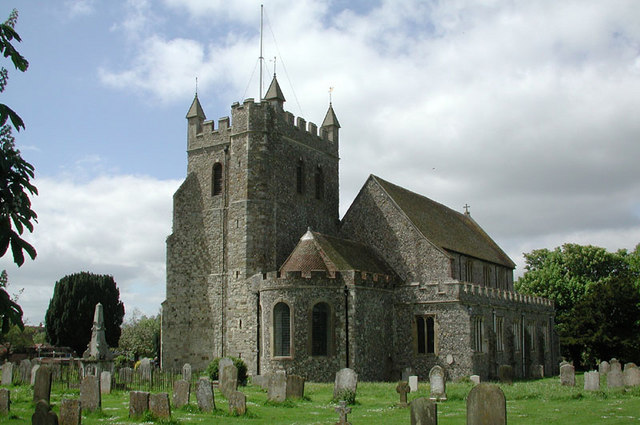
Wye Church, 2002

51.18449°N 0.93791°E

The present Anglican Church of Saint Gregory and Saint Martin at the junction of High Street, Church Street and Churchfield Way is grade I listed. Its original dedication was solely to Pope Gregory the Great. Saint Martin was added c. 1475, possibly to recognise the role of Battle Abbey which was itself dedicated to Saint Martin and owned the Manor of Wye, and to be consistent with Wye College.

A church on the present site was first constructed in 1290, and considerably more extensive than the present building. There was a longer nave and much larger chancel. The Steeple had a tall wooden spire clad with lead. Of this church, only the outer nave walls, built of whole flints, survive. The original door and window openings have all been replaced.

In the 15th century Cardinal Kempe constructed Wye College and rebuilt the church. New, perpendicular style door and window openings matched the college, and the walls were faced with the flat surfaces of split flints. The stronger structure supported a clerestory and fine roof.

In 1548, the Reformation dictated images of the saints be removed, and following 1549's introduction of the Anglican prayer book, newly redundant silverware was sold. The rood screen however, between the nave and chancel survived, as did extensive gilded and painted glass.

Five years later, Catholic Queen Mary (1553–8) reinstated ornamentation and the lighting of candles, but papist resurgence did not stop there. Richard Thornden, Bishop of Dover and Nicholas Harpsfield, Archdeacon of Canterbury committed 10 Protestants to be burnt. Two of them, John Philpot of Tenterden, and Thomas Stephens of Biddenden were consumed by fire at Wye Church gate in January 1557. The next year however, cautiously Anglican Queen Elizabeth I was crowned and Protestant communion restored.

In 1572, the steeple was struck by lightning and burned, melting the lead cladding of the spire. Extensive repairs were finally paid for by 1579, but the structure was reported to be in much ruin and decay again by 1581. That may have been caused by the 1580 Dover Straits earthquake. In any event, further repairs to the steeple were carried out in 1582 and 1584.

The five great bells had been damaged by the 1572 fire and were finally, satisfactorily recast in 1593, though once raised back into place their weight would have added considerably to stresses on the steeple. In 1628, the wooden spire was replaced once again, but concerns about the state of the chancel, and risk of the steeple falling were not addressed.

On 22 March 1686, the steeple tower collapsed. Almost all the transepts; most of the chancel, and part of the nave were destroyed. The gilded and painted glass windows were gone, as were grand tombs of Cardinal Kempe and his father Thomas. Between 1700 and 1711 the church was reconstructed in its present, smaller form. Charles Finch, 4th Earl of Winchilsea, as holder of the tithes, was required to rebuild the chancel and the parish had to pay the remainder. While the new chancel was finely crafted, work on the much reduced tower prioritised strength and economy. The new church was barely half the size of its predecessor.

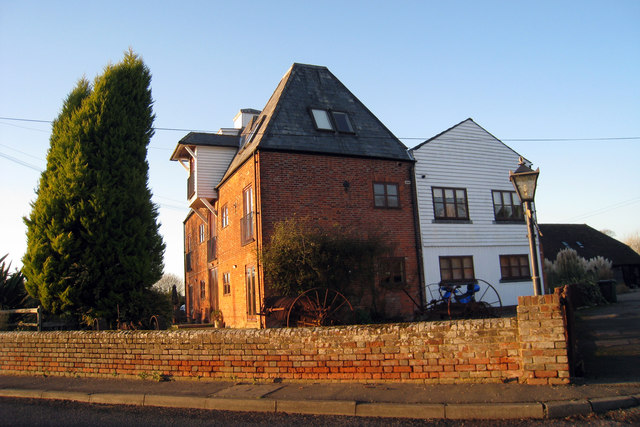
Spring Grove Oast, 2008

Lady Joanna Thornhill, for whom the Lady Joanna Thornhill School is named, died during the period of reconstruction and was buried in the new building she had helped fund.

Since 2011, and as of 2024, the incumbent (vicar) of the Wye benefice, and area dean of the Deanery of Stour Valley, is the Reverend Ravi Holy. He is an Old Etonian, and formerly an alcoholic; drug abuser; satanist; punk rock musician, member of a Pentecostal congregation. Holy has performed an Elvis themed funeral at Wye. Participation in a Comedy For Clergy workshop led to him appearing on BBC London and BBC Breakfast. He performs in the trio White Collar Comedy whose tagline is:

They're Middle Class, Middle Aged and Middle England. And all three are working vicars

=== Saint Ambrose Catholic Church ===
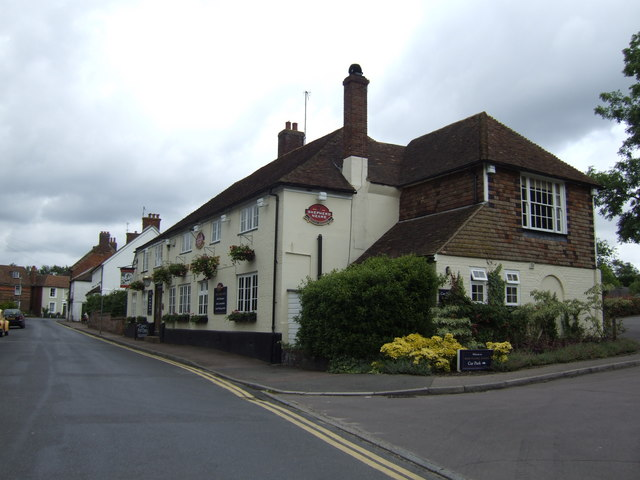
New Flying Horse, 2007

51.18153°N 0.93763°E

Saint Ambrose Catholic Church, off Oxenturn Road, is a chapel of ease built in 1954 for the Parish of Saint Teresa of Avila, Ashford. Mass was celebrated in Wye for the first time since the reformation during World War II, when Wye College's dining hall was made available to Catholic servicemen and local residents. Subsequently, and before the present building was constructed, a former stable at the Old Vicarage on Bridge Street was used as a chapel.

The pews are from E. W. Pugin's original, demolished church of St Teresa in Ashford. Two possibly 18th century benches came from the chapel at Calehill House, Little Chart, itself demolished in 1952.

=== Sport ===
Wye Cricket Club plays at Horton Meadow off Cherry Garden Lane. In 2014, it received a £2,000 grant from the Wye Children's Playing Field Charity

Wye Tennis Club's five courts, and a Multi-Use Games Area are located at the Wye Village Hall recreation ground on Bridge Street. The club began in 1971 with two locally constructed courts and use of a football club's changing room. A 1980 Portacabin was replaced in 2008 with the present purpose built clubhouse, and by 2012, there were five floodlit courts.

Wye Juniors FC plays football from the former Wye College recreation ground off Cherry Garden Lane. A fire destroyed its pavilion in 2022. The pavilion ws rebuilt during 2024 and a football tournament was held at the ground in June 2025

=== Lady Joanna Thornhill School ===
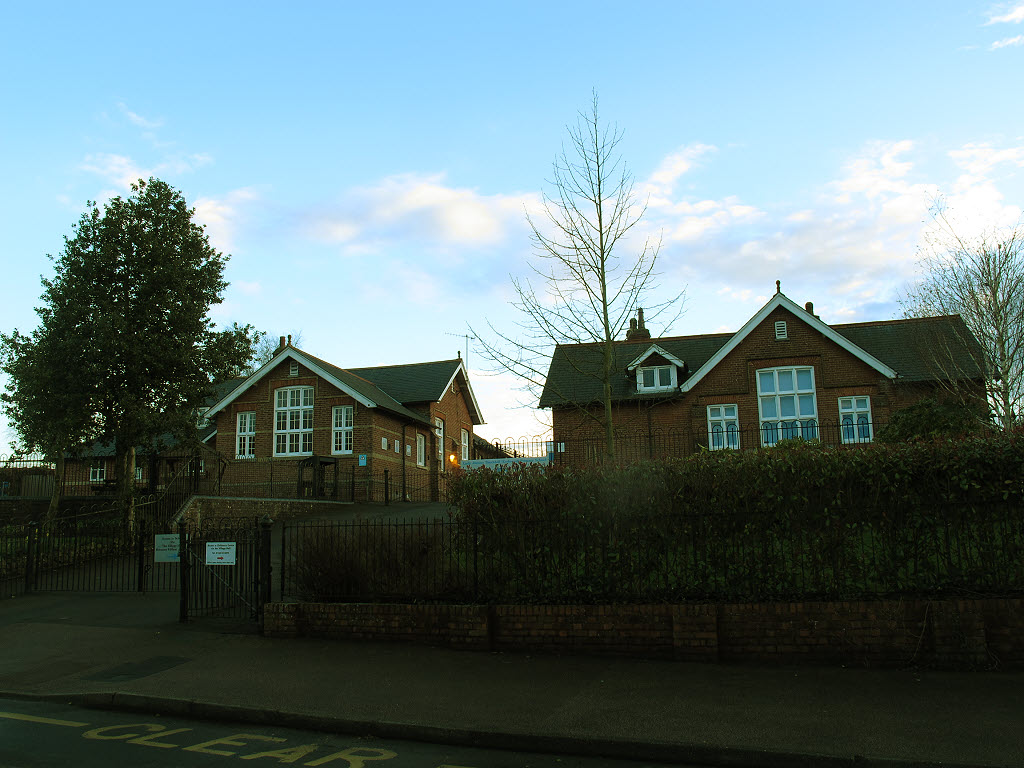
Lady Joanna Thornhill School

51.18327°N 0.93292°E

Lady Joanna Thornhill Primary School, on Bridge Street, is named after the daughter (1635–1708) of Sir Bevil Grenville, second wife of Richard Thornhill of Olantigh, and Woman of the Bedchamber to Queen Catherine of Braganza. Thornhill's will funded a charity school for Wye in 1708. She is buried at Wye Church.

Her trust purchased part of Cardinal Kempe's chantry buildings at Wye College, and other investment property with which to endow her education institution. Sir George Wheler, who some sources claim was Lady Joanna Thornhill's nephew, acquired the buildings south of the chantry's cloister in 1713.

Boys attending Lady Thornhill's charity school were taught in the Old Hall, and girls the Parlour. Their schoolmaster received £30 per annum salary and the school mistress £20, from rent on property purchased in Wye and on Romney Marsh.

Nevertheless, the situation was poor. In spite of the trust's "munificent" annual endowment income of £200, an inspector passed the facilities "but with the greatest reluctance". He observed the Old Hall used as boys' schoolroom "though a fine old room, is ill-adapted for a school and requires constant repair", and bemoaned that "as long as they are allowed to use this old room, the inhabitants of Wye will not lift a finger towards the erection of new schools". His conclusion was that Wye "has about the worst schools in the neighbourhood".

In 1892, Kent and Surrey County Council purchased the old school premises for £1,000, to establish the South Eastern Agricultural College there, the school ultimately moving to its current location.

As of 2022, Lady Joanna Thornhill School is operated by The Care Foundation Trust.

Headmasters of Lady Joanna Thornhill School
Edward Vincer	In office 1797
William Adams	In office c. 1820, c. 1842
Henry Holmes	1855–1859
John Herbert	Appointed 1859, in office 1862

=== Wye School ===
Wye School is a mixed, secondary free school that opened on Olantigh Road in 2013, and expanded into new buildings in 2017. It is operated by United Learning and includes the former Wye College Kempe Centre and Department of Hop Research site.

=== Spring Grove School ===
51.18311°N 0.92069°E

Spring Grove School on Harville Road is an independent, fee paying nursery and preparatory school for boys and girls aged 2–11. Its 14 acres (5.7 ha) site includes a forest school.

The 10-bedroom 17th century mansion was formerly home of author Joseph Conrad, politician Baroness Trumpington, and clergyman Thomas Brett.

== Landmarks ==
=== Wye Bridge ===
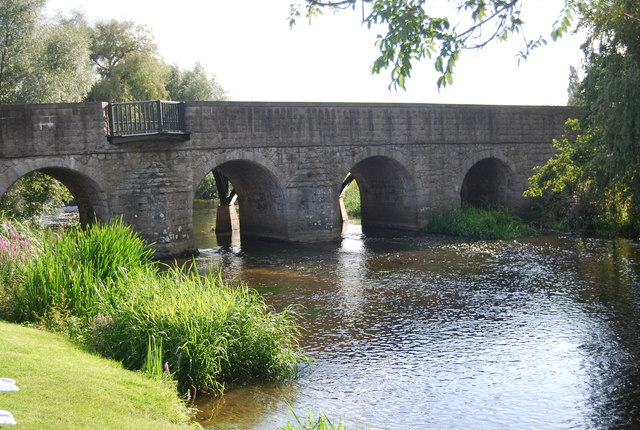
Wye Bridge, 2014

51.18474°N 0.93017°E

The present grade II* listed bridge over the River Stour was built in 1638 to replace a wooden structure; repaired in 1684, and altered in 1881. It has five stone arches over the river, and secondary ones between the river and railway line. The stone parapet was removed in 1881 when an iron roadway was constructed to reinforce the original stone structure. A stone memorial plaque recording the 1683 construction and 1684 repairs is preserved in the Church of Saint Gregory and Saint Martin.

The weir downstream of the bridge was constructed in 1962 to replace an earlier one.

=== Wye Mill ===
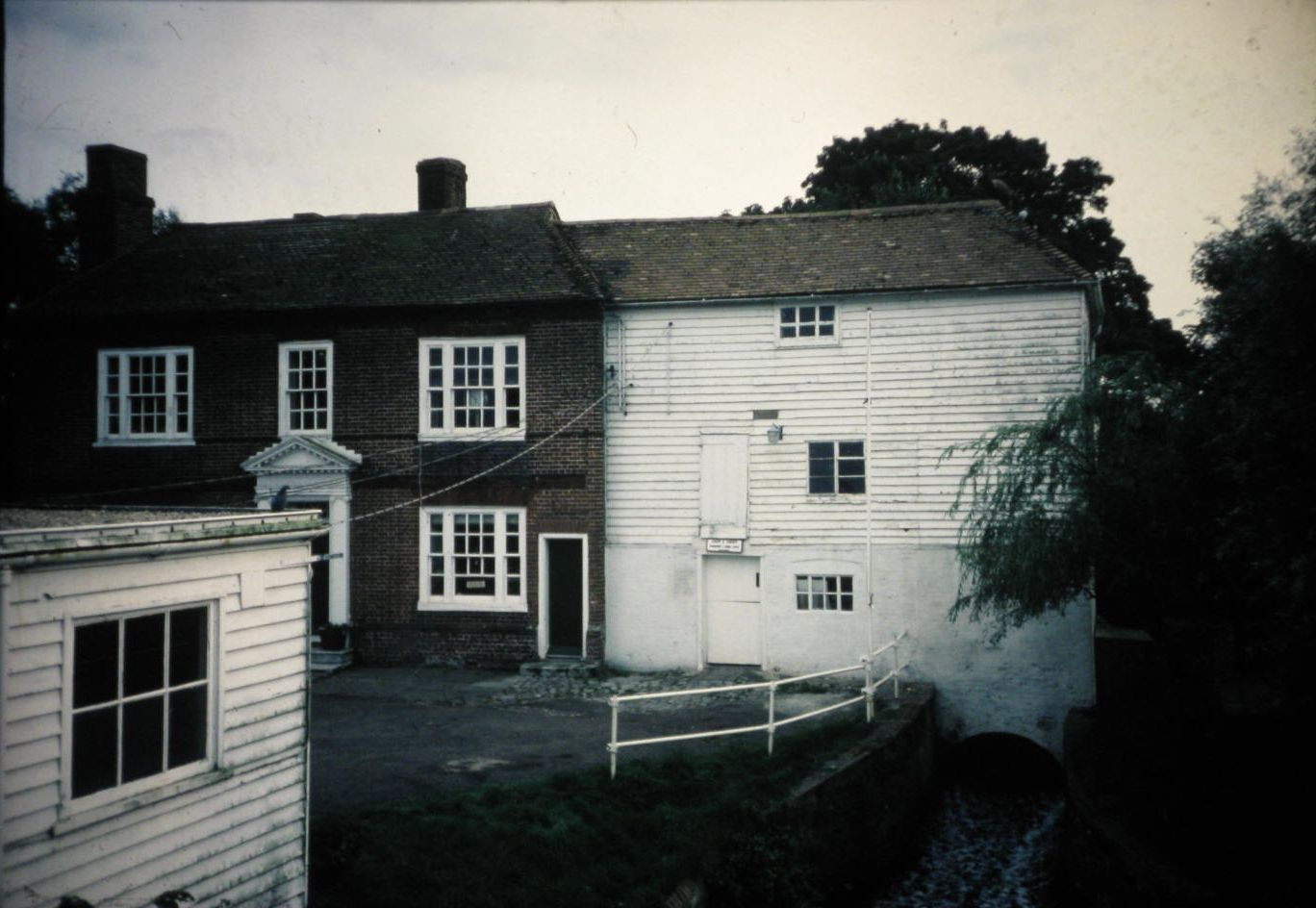
Wye Mill, 1982

51.184420°N 0.93040°E

The 18th century brick built mill house; timber framed mill building, and mill race are grade II listed. It was originally a water mill for grinding corn. T Denne and Sons operated the premises from 1930 for the production of animal feed, and then as an agricultural merchant's depot through to c. 1990. As of 2022, it is a guest house.

=== Wye Crown ===
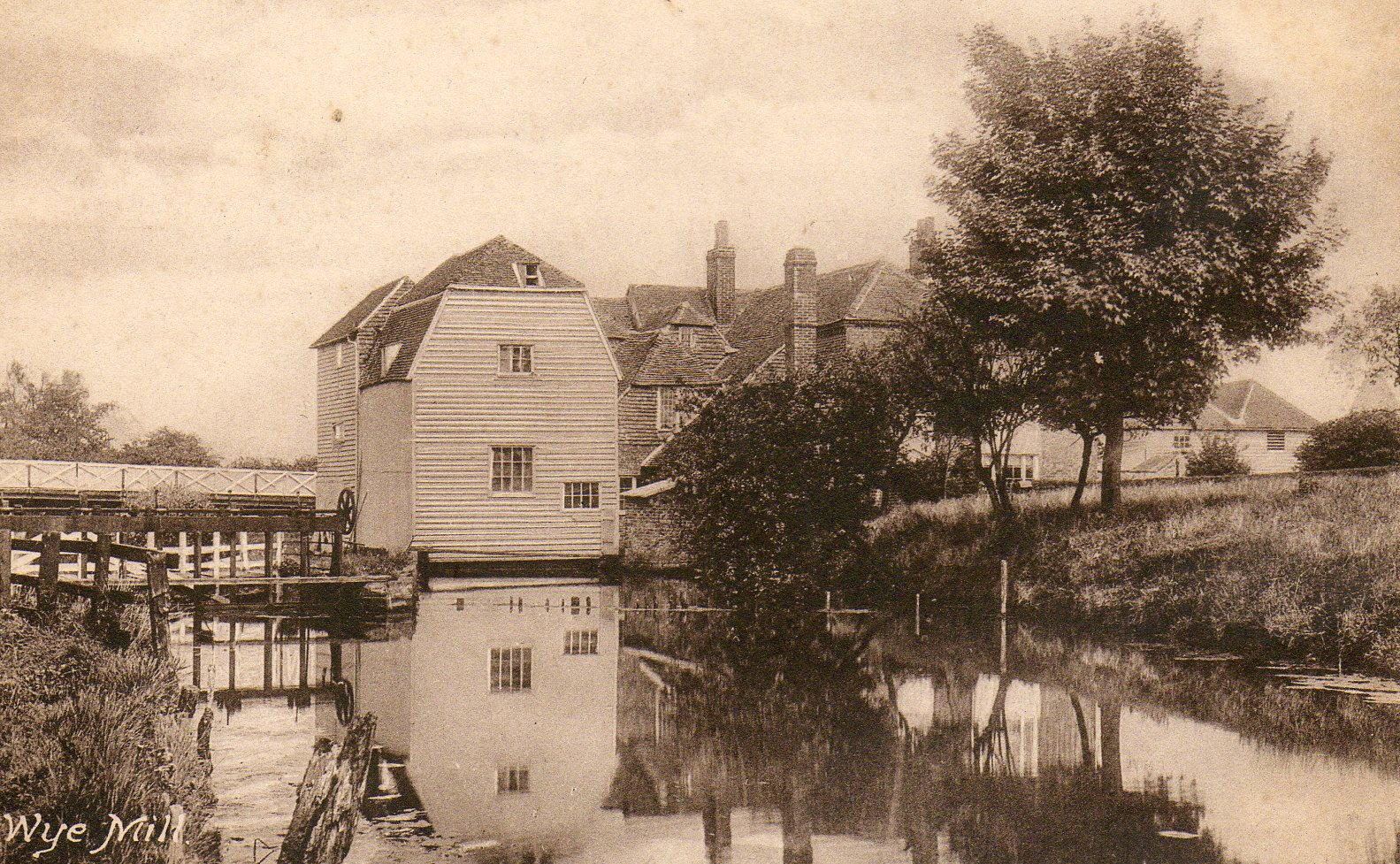
Wye Mill, c1910

To the east of the village, Wye Crown is a hill figure cut into the North Downs chalk, by Wye College students in 1902, to commemorate the coronation of Edward VII. It is part of the Wye and Crundale Downs Site of Special Scientific Interest.

=== Olantigh ===
Olantigh has been home to the Kempe, Thornhill, Sawbridge, Sawbridge-Erle-Drax and Loudon families.

=== Withersdane Hall ===
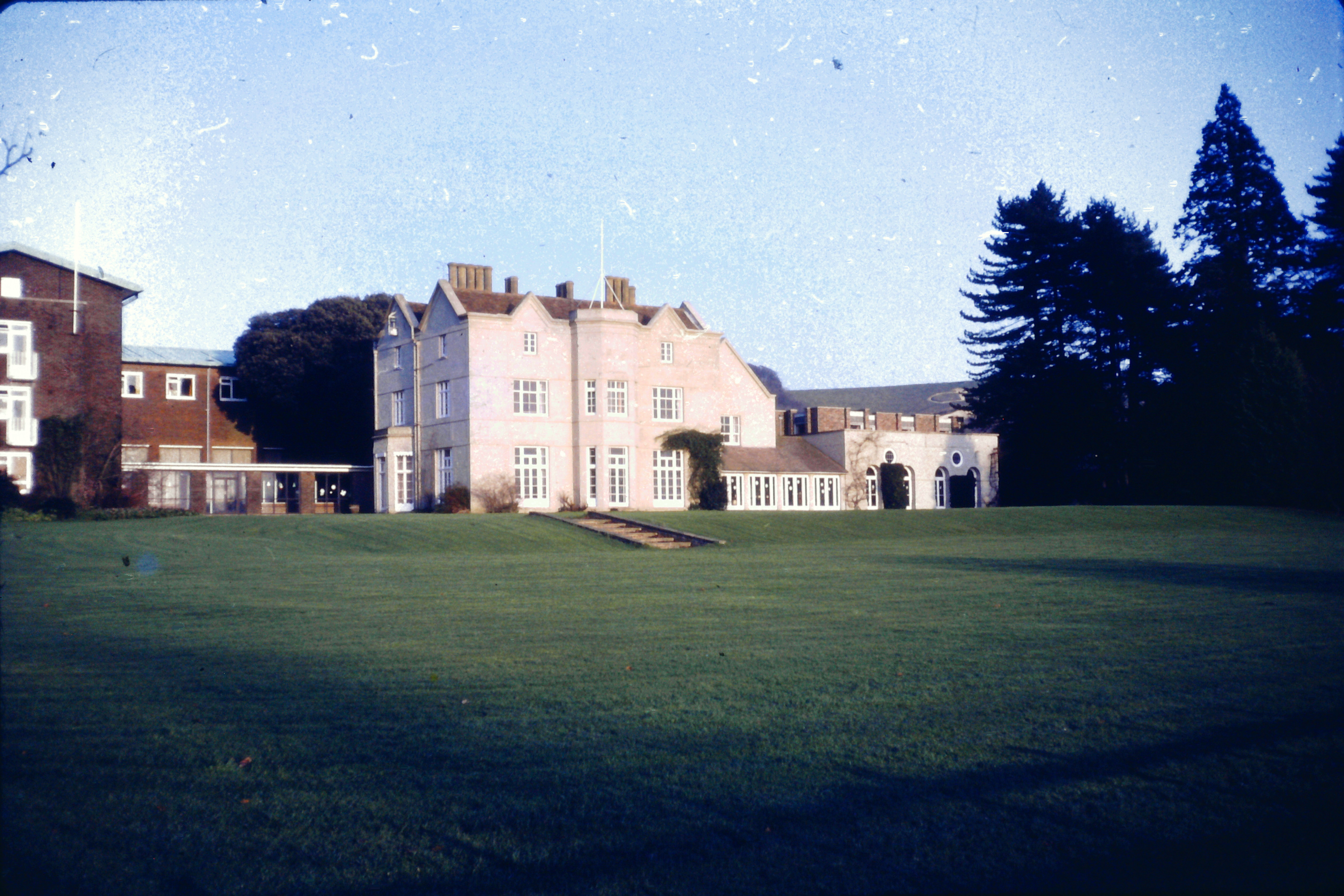
Withersdane Hall, 1983

In 2019, Imperial College sold the former Wye College Withersdane Hall to private, for profit, Università degli Studi Niccolò Cusano who intend to accommodate approximately 250, mainly Italian and French, students there.

=== Other listed buildings ===
As of 2022, there are 139 separately designated listed buildings in Wye with Hinxhill Parish, including:

		Listing	
Old Swan House	134, Bridge Street	II*	15th
Old Flying Horse	1, The Green	II*	14th
Old Manor House	36, Church Street	II*	16th
Yew Trees	Scotton Street	II*	17th

== Transport ==
=== Railway ===
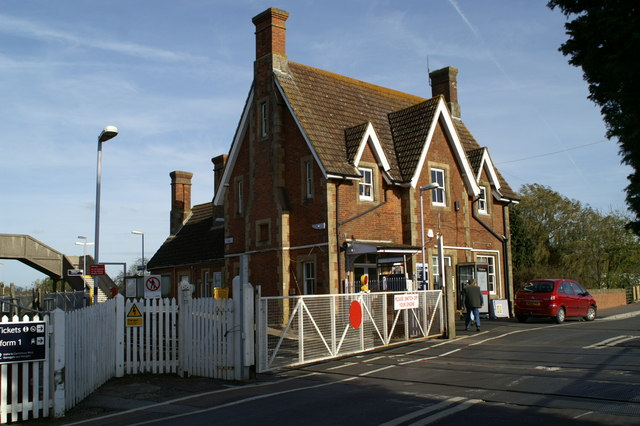
Wye railway station, 2009

Until 2022, the level crossing gates at Wye railway station had been manually operated. Road closures of typically 10–12 minutes, and sometimes up to 15 minutes, for trains to pass had been reported. One resident produced a telephone app to advise residents when the barrier was closed, and help them choose when to travel.

=== Walking ===
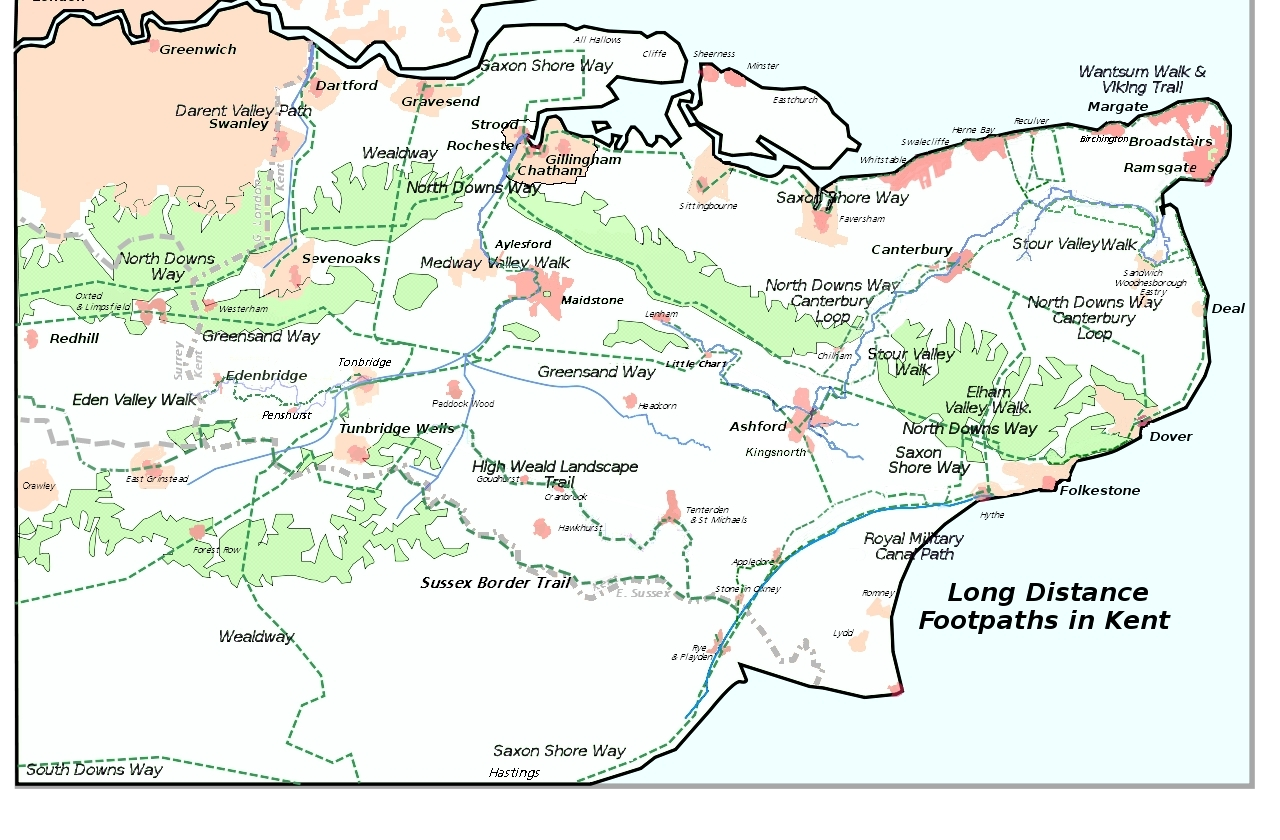
Kent long-distance footpaths

Wye is on the southern route of the North Downs Way where it crosses the Stour Valley Walk and follows the path of the Pilgrims Way.

=== Cantii Way ===
The Cantii Way is a 145 miles (233 km), circular cycling route that uses cycle paths, bridleways and quiet roads. It begins and ends in Wye where it links with National Cycle Route 18. Cycling UK inaugurated the Cantii Way in 2022, partly to celebrate the Platinum Jubilee of Elizabeth II.

The route also passes through Canterbury, Whitstable, Dungeness, Hythe, Tenterden, Folkestone and Dover – the former land of the Cantii for whom it is named.

== People ==
- Aphra Behn (1640–1689), Restoration dramatist and spy
- Evelyn Mary Dunbar (1906–1960), artist
- John Kemp (c. 1380–1454), cardinal, Archbishop of Canterbury and Lord Chancellor
- Bryan Keith-Lucas (1912–1996), political scientist
- Catharine Macaulay (1731–1791), historian and republican
- Ernest Stanley Salmon (1871–1959), hop breeder, mycologist and tennis player
- Alex Loudon (born 1980), cricketer
- Thomas Kempe (died 1489), Bishop of London
- Thomas Brett (1667–1743), nonjuring clergyman and author
- Joseph Conrad (1857–1924), author
- Sir Charles Scudamore (1779–1849), physician
- Robert Billing (1834–1898), Bishop of Bedford
- Arthur Willink (1850–1913), theologian and author
- John Richardson (born 1950), Dean of Bradford
- John Sawbridge (1732–1795), politician
- Samuel Elias Sawbridge (1769–1850), politician
- John Erle-Drax (1800–1887), landowner and politician
- Jacob Sawbridge (1665–1748), banker, politician and scoundrel
- Mark Deller (born 1938), conductor and countertenor
- Anne Finch, Countess of Winchilsea (1661–1720), poet
- Heneage Finch, 5th Earl of Winchilsea (1657–1726), nonjuror
- John Locke (1632–1704), philosopher and physician
- Caleb Banks (1659–1696), politician
- Sir John Banks, 1st Baronet (1627–1699), merchant and politician
- Ethel Gabain (1883–1950), lithographer and war artist
- Tobias Boshell (born 1950), musician
- Eve Billing (1923–2019), plant pathologist
- Jean Barker, Baroness Trumpington (1922–2018), politician
- Frederick Vincent Theobald (1868–1930), entomologist

== In popular culture ==
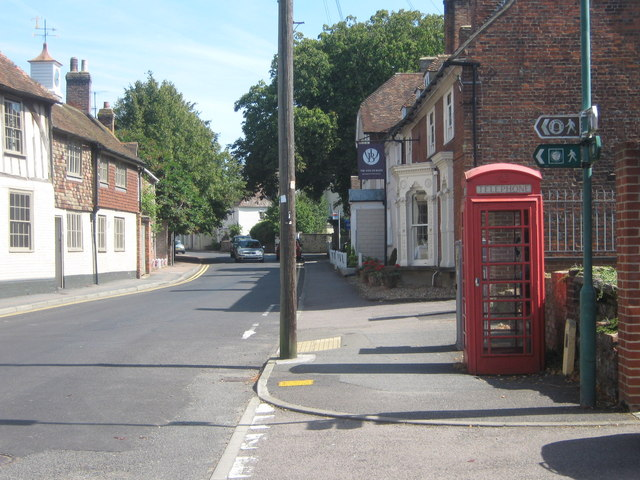
Bridge Street, 2009

=== Riddley Walker ===
Author Russell Hoban repurposes Wye as "How" in his 1980, post apocalyptic novel Riddley Walker. Withersdane becomes "Widders Dump"; The Devil's Kneading Trough, "Mr Clevvers Roaling Place", and Pet Street, "Pig Sweet".

=== The Perfect Village ===
In 2006, Wye featured in the BBC Television show The Perfect Village.

=== The Darling Buds of May ===
In the 1992 Darling Buds of May episode Stranger at the Gates, Pop Larkin's visit to the Kent County Council's offices is filmed outside the former Imperial College at Wye buildings.

=== Cape Wrath ===
2007 television drama Cape Wrath includes scenes filmed at Wye College. The Old Lecture Theatre's steeply tiered oak benches masquerade as a London academic institution.

=== Gadget Man ===
Richard Ayoade and Phill Jupitus look out over the Weald to Romney Marsh during Channel 4's 2014 series of Gadget Man. The episode was filmed at the Devil's Kneading Trough in Wye's National Nature Reserve, as they test powered leg exoskeletons.

=== Female war artists ===
World War II British official war artists Evelyn Dunbar and Ethel Gabain also produced landscapes of the scenery around Wye.

=== Centennial ===
1978 American miniseries Centennial, and the 1974 book it is based upon, reference a fictional British aristocratic investor, Lord Venneford of Wye.

== Civil parish ==
In 1961 the parish had a population of 1989. On 1 April 1987 the parish was abolished and merged with Hinxhill to form "Wye with Hinxhill".
