= Mildred Eldridge =

British artist (1909–1991)

Mildred E. Eldridge
- Born: 1 August 1909; Wimbledon, London, England
- Died: 10 March 1991 (aged 81)
- Education: Wimbledon School of Art; Royal College of Art
- Known for: Water colour and mural painting
- Spouse: R. S. Thomas

Mildred Elsie Eldridge known as Elsi Eldridge, (1 August 1909 – 10 March 1991) was a British artist, mural painter and book illustrator.

== Biography ==
Eldridge was born in Wimbledon in London where her father was pawnbroker who later became a jeweller. She attended Wimbledon School of Art before studying at the Royal College of Art where she was taught by William Rothenstein and Eric Ravilious. In her final year at the RCA, Eldridge won the Prix de Rome prize and a scholarship to study at the British School in Rome. Returning to England in 1936 she worked, along with Evelyn Dunbar, Charles Mahoney and others, on a large scale set of murals based on Aesop's fables at Brockley County Secondary School, now the upper site of Prendergast School in Brockley.

In 1937 Eldridge held a very successful solo show at the Beaux Arts Gallery in London. Later that year she moved to Oswestry where she taught at Oswestry Girls' High School and Moreton Hall School in Shropshire. Following a 1939 commission, executed with Muriel Minter, for a stained-glass window at Llanpumsaint parish church, Eldridge moved to Wales. There she married the poet and Anglican priest R. S. Thomas in 1940, whom she had met while teaching in Oswestry. She designed the dust-jacket for his first volume of published poems, Stones of the Field in 1947 and in due course, works by Eldridge would decorate a number of the churches that Thomas served and preached in. She also worked with the Recording Britain and the Recording Wales projects throughout the 1940s to create depictions of war damaged, or otherwise at risk, buildings. Eldridge taught as a lecturer in the extra-mural department of the University of Wales from 1953 and also returned to mural painting in the mid-1950s. She created a 120-foot (37 m) long, multi-panel, work The Dance of Life for the dining room of the nurses' home at the Robert Jones and Agnes Hunt Orthopaedic Hospital near Oswestry. The mural, which depicts wildlife among Welsh and Italian landscapes and illustrates the negative impact of human activities upon nature, took Eldridge three years to complete, and has been described by the art historian Peter Lord as "one of the most remarkable large-scale works ever painted in Wales". The mural was put into storage in 1999 but from 2011 has been on public display at Glyndwr University.

Eldridge had a number of solo exhibitions during her career, notably at the National Library of Wales in Aberystwyth during 1959 and at the Powys Fine Art Room in Welshpool in 1961. She exhibited in group shows with the Royal Watercolour Society, with the Royal Cambrian Academy, the Royal Scottish Academy and at the Royal Academy while Abbott and Holder hosted a memorial exhibition in 1993. A further retrospective was held during 2013 at Plas Glyn-y-Weddow in Llanbedrog. The National Portrait Gallery, London holds a self-portrait of her and her husband in its collection, and the Victoria and Albert Museum in London and the National Museum of Wales in Cardiff hold other examples of her work.

== Books illustrated ==
- The Three Royal Monkeys by Walter de la Mare, (Faber and Faber, 1946)
- Compassionate Herbs by Hilda Leyel, (Faber and Faber, 1946)
- South Wales and Monmouthshire (Vision of Wales) by Tom Richards (Elek, 1949)
- The Star-born by Henry Williamson (Faber and Faber, 1948)

== Books written and illustrated ==
- Gwenno the Goat, (Hart-Davis, 1957)
- In My Garden, (Medici Society)
- The Sea Shore, (Medici Society, 1986)
