= Eve Billing =

UK plant pathologist (1923–2019)

- Died: 18 February 2019, aged 95; Cirencester
- Education: University of Manchester, UK
- Known for: Fire blight disease of apple and pear trees
- Scientific career
- Fields: microbiology; plant pathology
- Workplaces: University of Reading; East Malling Research Station, Kent

Eve Billing (1923–2019) was a UK plant pathologist specialising in diseases of fruit trees especially fire blight caused by Erwinia amylovora bacteria. She introduced a modelling system to predict the likelihood of outbreaks of fire blight and also methods for pathogen identification and treatment.

== Career ==
Her career was as a plant pathologist. She specialised in fire blight, a serious world-wide disease of apple, pear and some other fruit trees within the Rosaceae. It is caused by Erwinia amylovora bacteria. She introduced Billing's integrated system, a modelling system to predict the probability of fire blight outbreaks based on weather information and thus improve disease management. Temperature and rainfall when the trees were in flower were key determining factors. She continued to develop it to be applicable more widely and others have since developed it further. She also studied the causal bacteria in detail, including the capsule that led to appreciation of the importance of biofilms in the disease process. Virulence factors, and the basis of natural non-virulent mutants were also part of her research. She was also interested in the potential to use bacteriophages in fire blight disease control.

In 1966 she introduced a series of biochemical tests (LOPAT tests) that were effective in identifying bacterial Pseudomonas groups and species.

Eve Billing trained in microbiology at the University of Manchester and by 1957 was employed by the UK government National Agricultural Advisory Service at Wye in Kent, UK. In 1962 she moved to the Department of Microbiology at the University of Reading. By 1972 she was at East Malling Research Station where she was employed for the rest of her career. She retired in the early 1980s but continued research in her kitchen and through correspondence with researchers around the world. Her last publication was in 2011. Her work on transmission of fire blight was cited during World Trade Organisation dispute settlements over fruit imports.

== Awards ==
The non-pathogenic species Erwinia billingiae is named after her. It may act antagonistically to the causal agents of fire blight and be useful for biocontrol.

The Second International Symposium on Fire Blight of Rosaceous Plants, June 2019, was dedicated to her memory.

== Personal life ==
Billing was born in 1923. She lived in Finchampstead and Horsmonden during her life, and late after retirement moved to Cirencester. She died 18 December 2019.

== Publications ==
Billing was author or co-author of over 35 scientific publications during more than 50 years from the mid-1950s until 2011 when she was in her late 80s. They included:

- Eve Billing (2011) Reflections on fireblight and questions. Acta Horticulturae 896 33-38
- Robert A. Bennett and Eve Billing (1980) Origin of the polysaccharide component of ooze from plants infected with Erwinia amylovora. Journal of General Microbiology 126 341-349
- R. A. Lelliot, E. Billing and A.C. Hayward (1966) A determinative scheme for the fluorescent plant pathogenic pseudomonads. Journal of Applied Bacteriology 29 470 - 487
- E. Billing (1960) An association between capsulation and phage sensitivity in Erwinia amylovora. Nature 186 819-820
- Eve Billing (1955) Studies on a soap tolerant organism: a new variety of Bacterium anitratum. Journal of General Microbiology 13 252-260
