= The Dance of Life (Eldridge) =

The Dance of Life is a set of panels created by the artist Mildred Eldridge in 1952-56.. The panels were originally located at the Robert Jones and Agnes Hunt Orthopaedic Hospital in Gobowen but have subsequently been moved twice.

The panels are 1.6m (5’) high, and when put together total 28.7m (94’) in length. They were created by Eldridge for Eldridge herself said "they contained every good idea that I had". They were made to decorate the dining room of a nurses' home and were commissioned by the hospital in 1951, after a fire had done substantial damage to its buildings. In 2005 the painting went into storage, where it remained until 2005, six years after the dining room had been converted into a storeroom. where it could not be seen by the public. It remained there until 2011, when, after restoration, it was moved to the new Creative Industries Building of Glyndŵr University, Wrexham.

In 2023, the murals were moved to Ellesmere College, a school in Shropshire.

== The panels ==
The individual panels show various scenes:

1. (in two sections) "Man in complete harmony with Nature, exemplified by the dancers celebrating the seasonal festivals of the year with dance and music"
2. “The custom of blessing the crops, going into the fields to place crosses among the crops that they may be abundant and safely gathered”
3. “The Beauty of Natural Decay…”
4. "Plovers & Silver Weed" (additional panel, later removed)
5. (in two sections) “Creation”; “The Dance of Death”
