= Francesco Fidanza =

Italian painter (1747–1819)

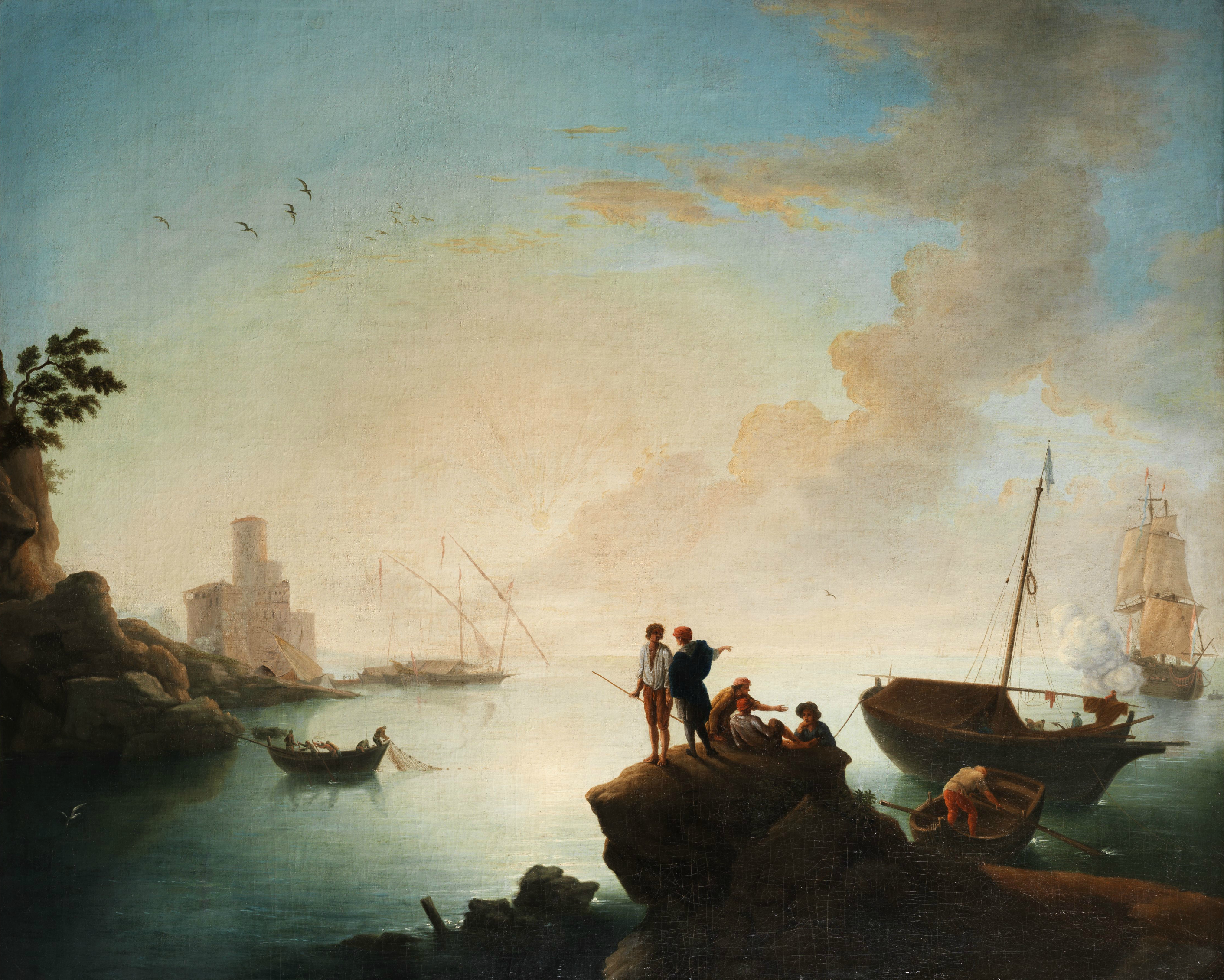
- Mediterranean scene with fishermen in front of a cannon shooting galley by Francesco Fidanza
- Born: 1747; Rome
- Died: February 7, 1819 (aged 71–72); Milan
- Occupation: painter

Francesco Fidanza (1747–1819) was an Italian painter, whose present legacy is based mainly on his landscapes.

Fidanza was born in Rome. He studied under Vernet and Charles-François Lacroix de Marseille (1700–1782). For Eugène Beauharnais he painted the Italian harbors, two of which, Ancona and Malamocco, with a landscape, are in the gallery of the Castle Brera at Milan. Fidanza died in Milan in 1819.

== Family ==
The father of Francesco Fidanza was Filippo Fidanza, who was born at Città di Castello (Sabina) in 1720; he was instructed in painting by Marco Benefial at Rome. Subsequently he studied and imitated the great masters, and many of his works in that genre are on public display in Rome's museums and collections. He died in 1790.

Francesco's brother, Gregorio, was a disciple of Claude Lorrain and Salvator Rosa, whom he imitated with success in his landscapes. He died in 1820.
