= Jacob Sawbridge =

British Member of Parliament (died 1748)

Jacob Sawbridge (c. 1665 – 11 July 1748) was a banker and the member of Parliament for Cricklade in England from 1715 to 23 January 1721.

He became a partner in the firm of Turner, Sawbridge, and Caswall, who traded as the Hollow Sword Blade Company. He was one of the original directors of the South Sea Company and was banned from the House of Commons and fined after that company became insolvent.
