= List of schools in the London Borough of Lewisham =

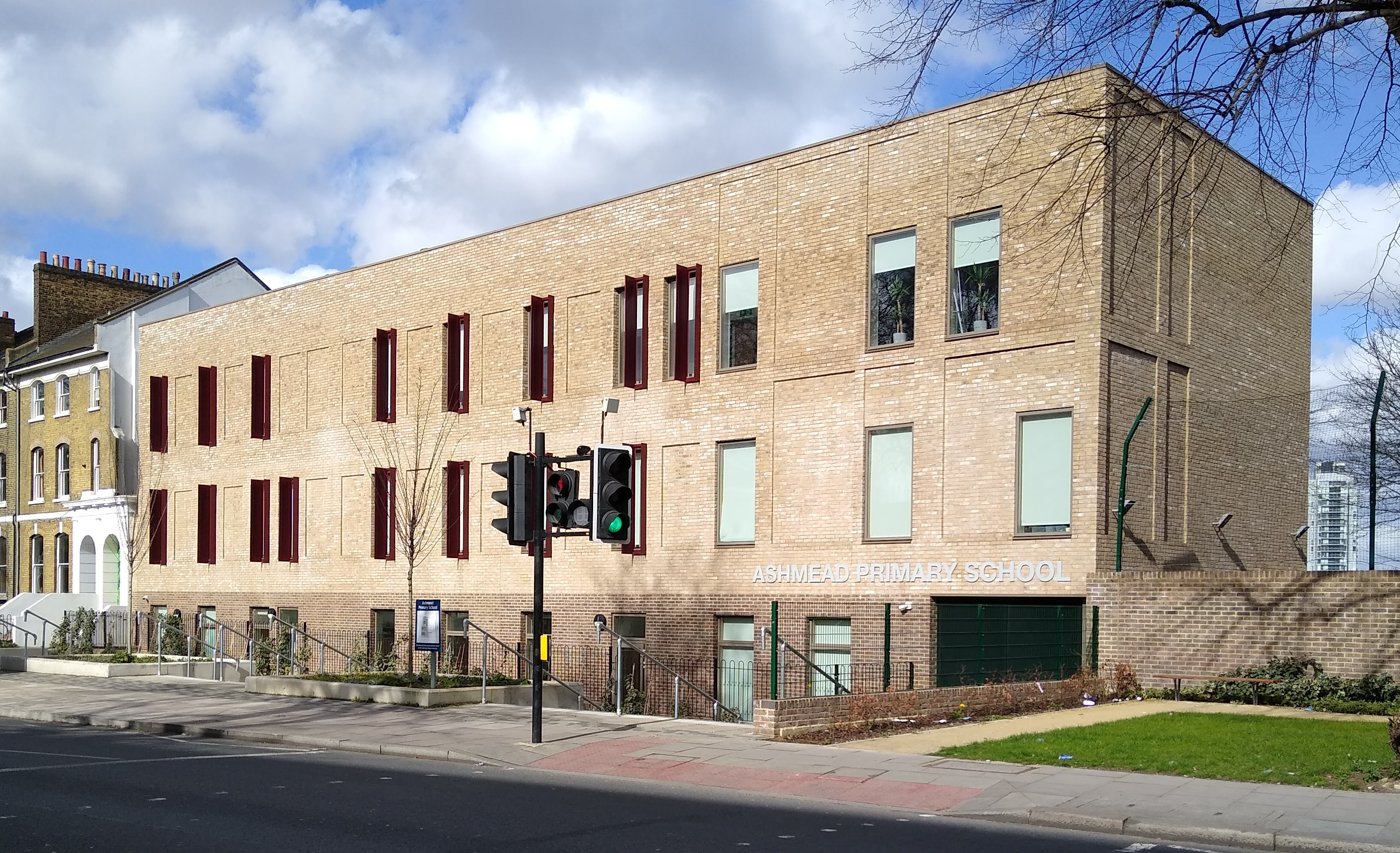
Ashmead Primary School

This is a lists of schools in the London Borough of Lewisham, England.

== State-funded schools ==
=== Primary schools ===
- Adamsrill Primary School
- All Saints' CE Primary School
- Ashmead Primary School
- Athelney Primary School
- Baring Primary School
- Beecroft Garden Primary School
- Brindishe Green School
- Brindishe Lee School
- Brindishe Manor School
- Childeric Primary School
- Cooper's Lane Primary School
- Dalmain Primary School
- Deptford Park Primary School
- Downderry Primary School
- Edmund Waller Primary School
- Elfrida Primary School
- Eliot Bank Primary School
- Fairlawn Primary School
- Forster Park Primary School
- Good Shepherd RC School
- Gordonbrock Primary School
- Grinling Gibbons Primary School
- Haberdashers' Hatcham Temple Grove
- Haberdashers' Hatcham Temple Grove Free School
- Haberdashers' Knights Temple Grove
- Haseltine Primary School
- Holbeach Primary School
- Holy Cross RC Primary School
- Holy Trinity CE Primary School
- Horniman Primary School
- John Ball Primary School
- John Stainer Community Primary School
- Kelvin Grove Primary School
- Kender Primary School
- Kilmorie Primary School
- Launcelot Primary School
- Lucas Vale Primary School
- Marvels Lane Primary School
- Myatt Garden Primary School
- Our Lady and St Philip Neri RC Primary School
- Perrymount Primary School
- Prendergast Ladywell School
- Prendergast Vale School
- Rathfern Primary School
- Rushey Green Primary School
- St Augustine's RC Primary School
- St Bartholomews's CE Primary School
- St George's CE Primary School
- St James's Hatcham CE Primary School
- St John Baptist Southend CE Primary School
- St Joseph's RC Primary School
- St Margaret's Lee CE Primary School
- St Mary Magdalen's RC Primary School
- St Mary's Lewisham CE Primary School
- St Matthew Academy
- St Michael's CE Primary School
- St Saviour's RC Primary School
- St Stephen's CE Primary School
- St William of York RC Primary School
- St Winifred's RC Primary School
- Sandhurst Primary School
- Stillness Infant School
- Stillness Junior School
- Tidemill Academy
- Torridon Primary School
- Trinity Church of England School
- Turnham Academy
- Twin Oaks Primary School

=== Secondary schools ===
- Addey and Stanhope School
- Bonus Pastor Catholic College
- Conisborough College
- Deptford Green School
- Forest Hill School
- Haberdashers' Hatcham College
- Haberdashers' Knights Academy
- Prendergast Ladywell School
- Prendergast School
- Prendergast Vale School
- St Matthew Academy
- Sedgehill School
- Sydenham School
- Trinity Church of England School

=== Special and alternative schools ===
- Abbey Manor College
- Brent Knoll School
- Drumbeat School
- Greenvale School
- New Woodlands School
- Watergate School

=== Further education ===
- Christ The King Sixth Form College
- LeSoCo

== Independent schools ==
=== Primary and preparatory schools ===
- The Family Learning School
- Heath House Preparatory School
- Kings Kids Christian School

=== Senior and all-through schools ===
- Marathon Science School
- St Dunstan's College
- Sydenham High School

=== Special and alternative schools ===
- Education-My Life Matters
- TLG Lewisham
- The Young Women's Hub
