= Lewisham =

Area of London

Coordinates: 51.461°N 0.005°W

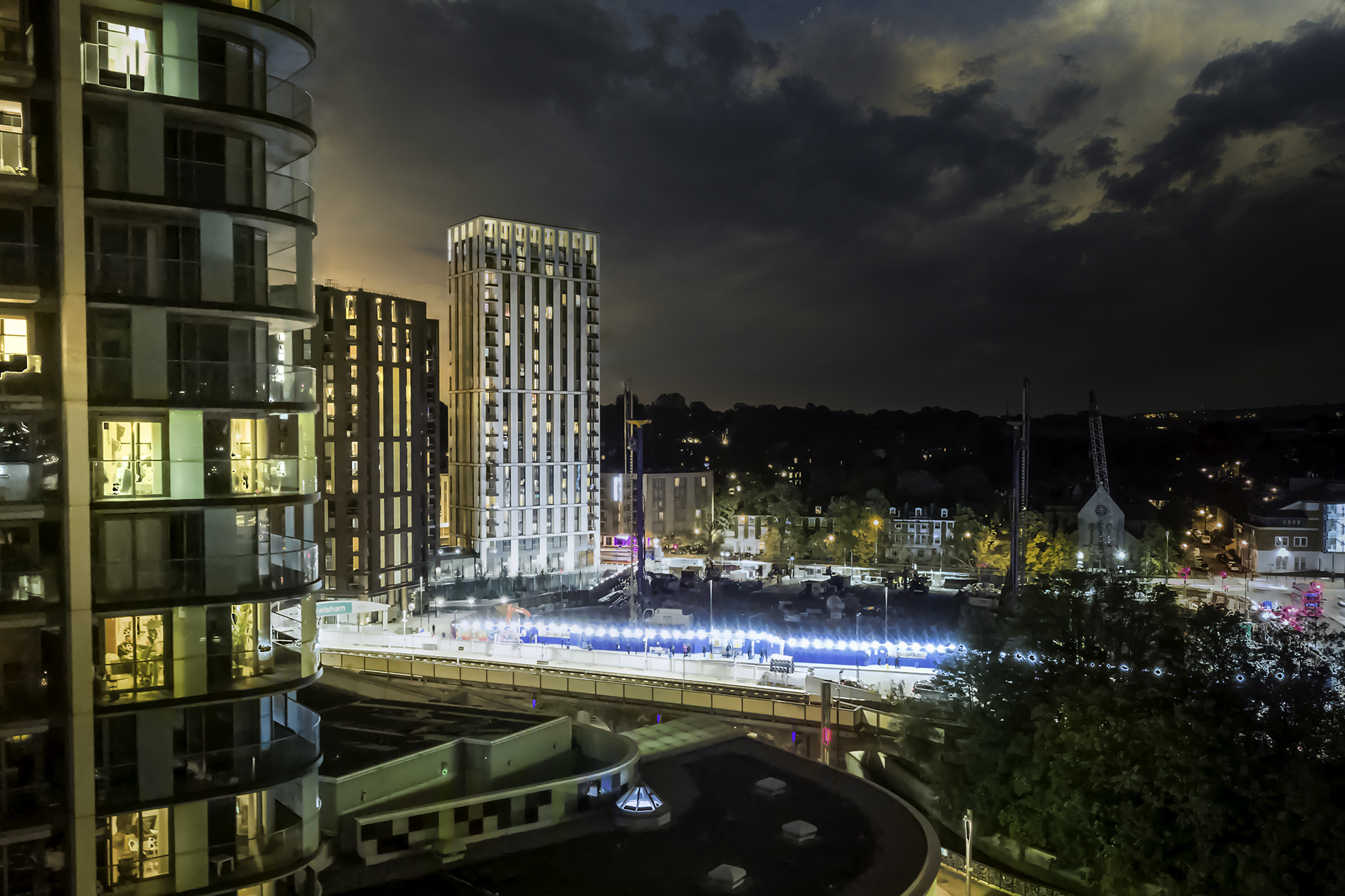
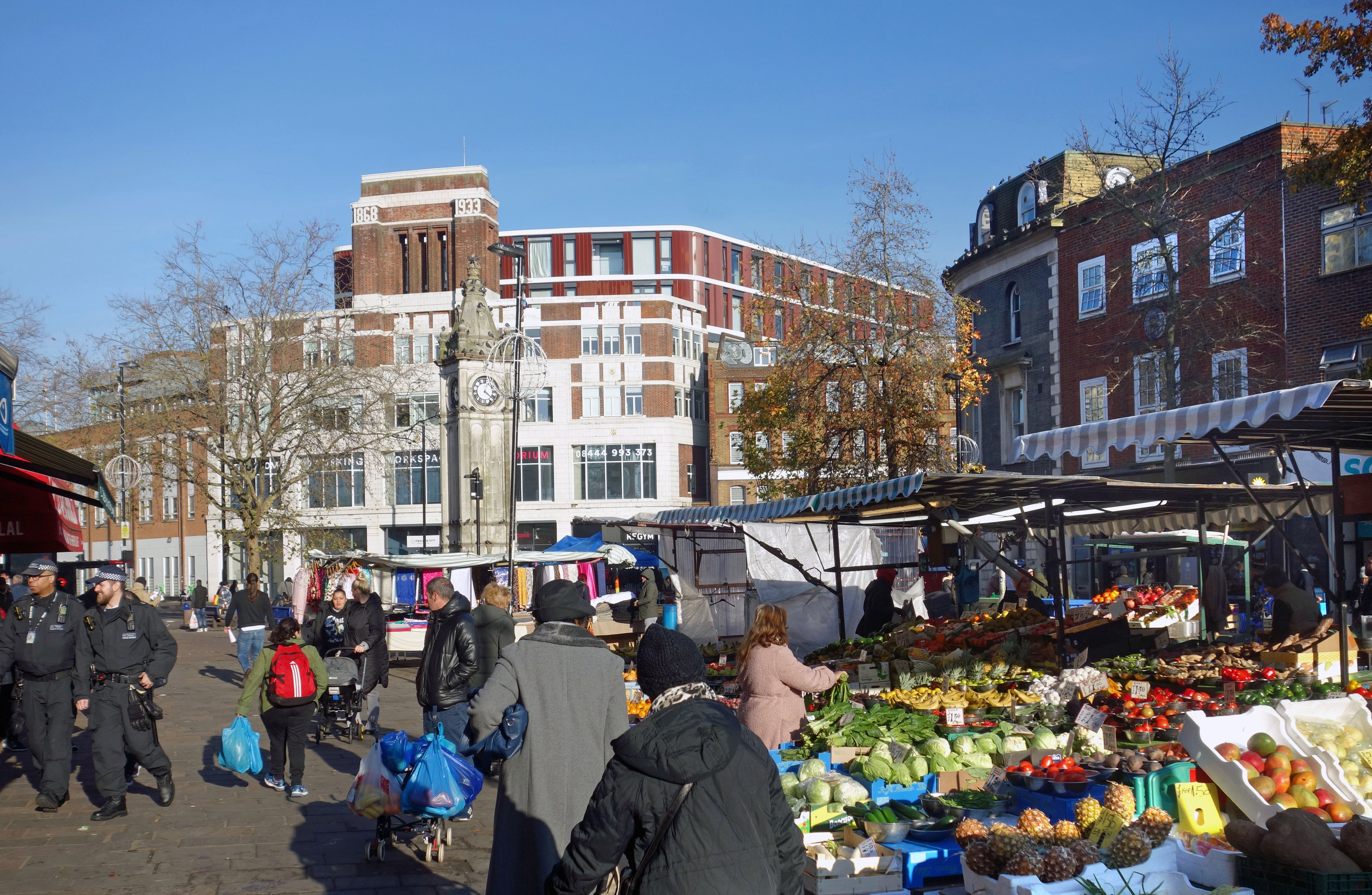
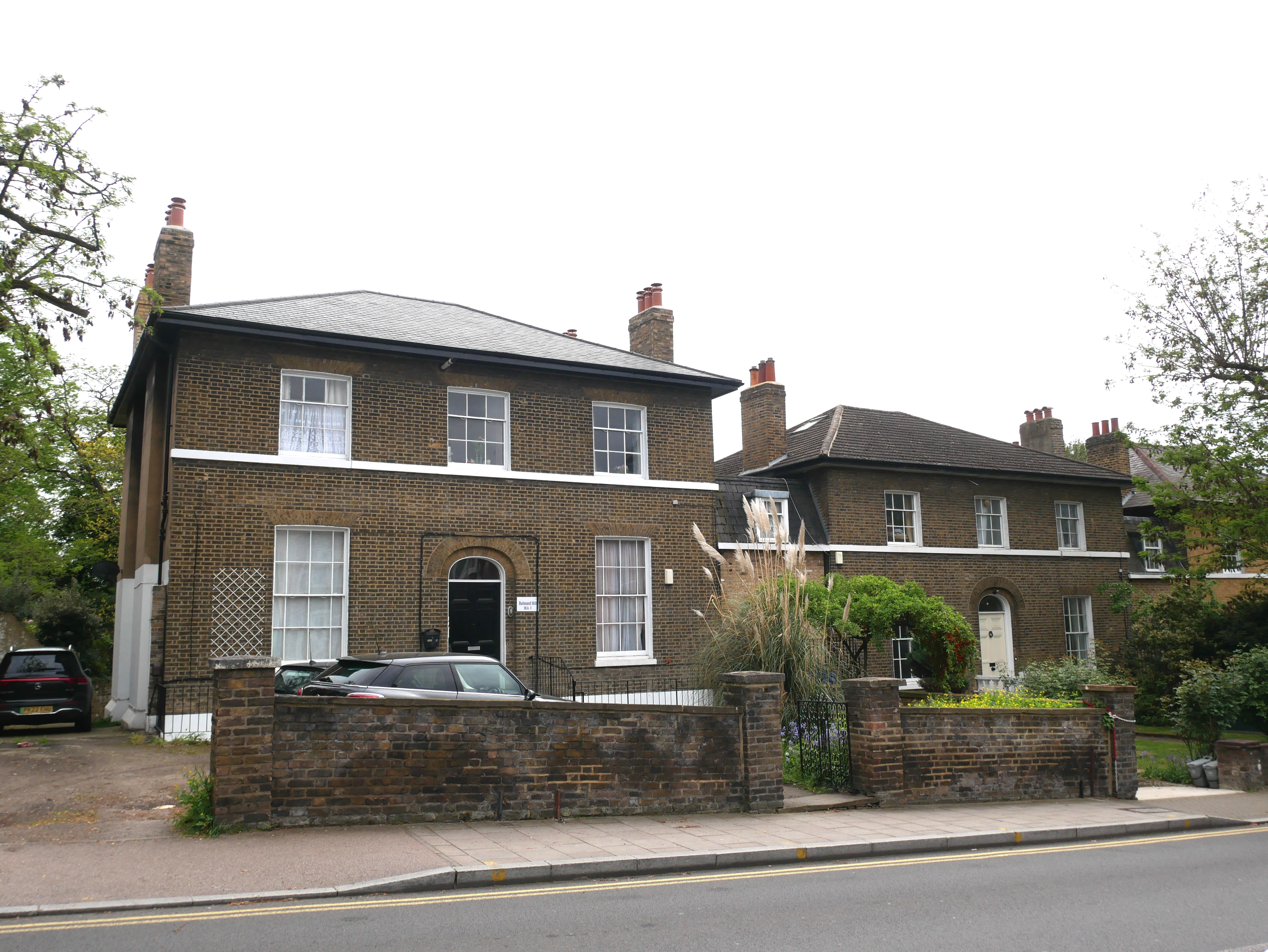
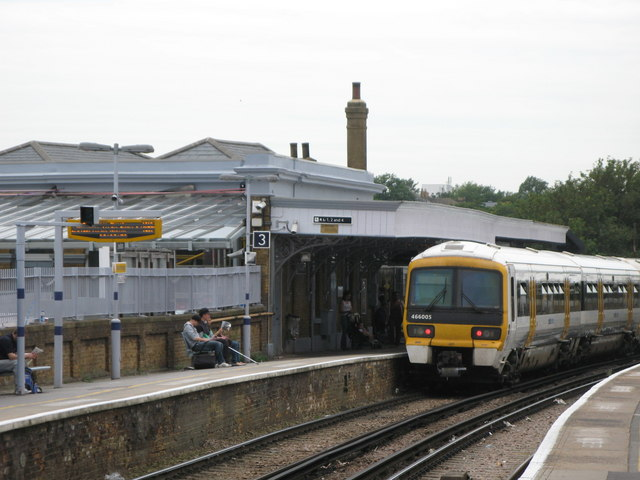
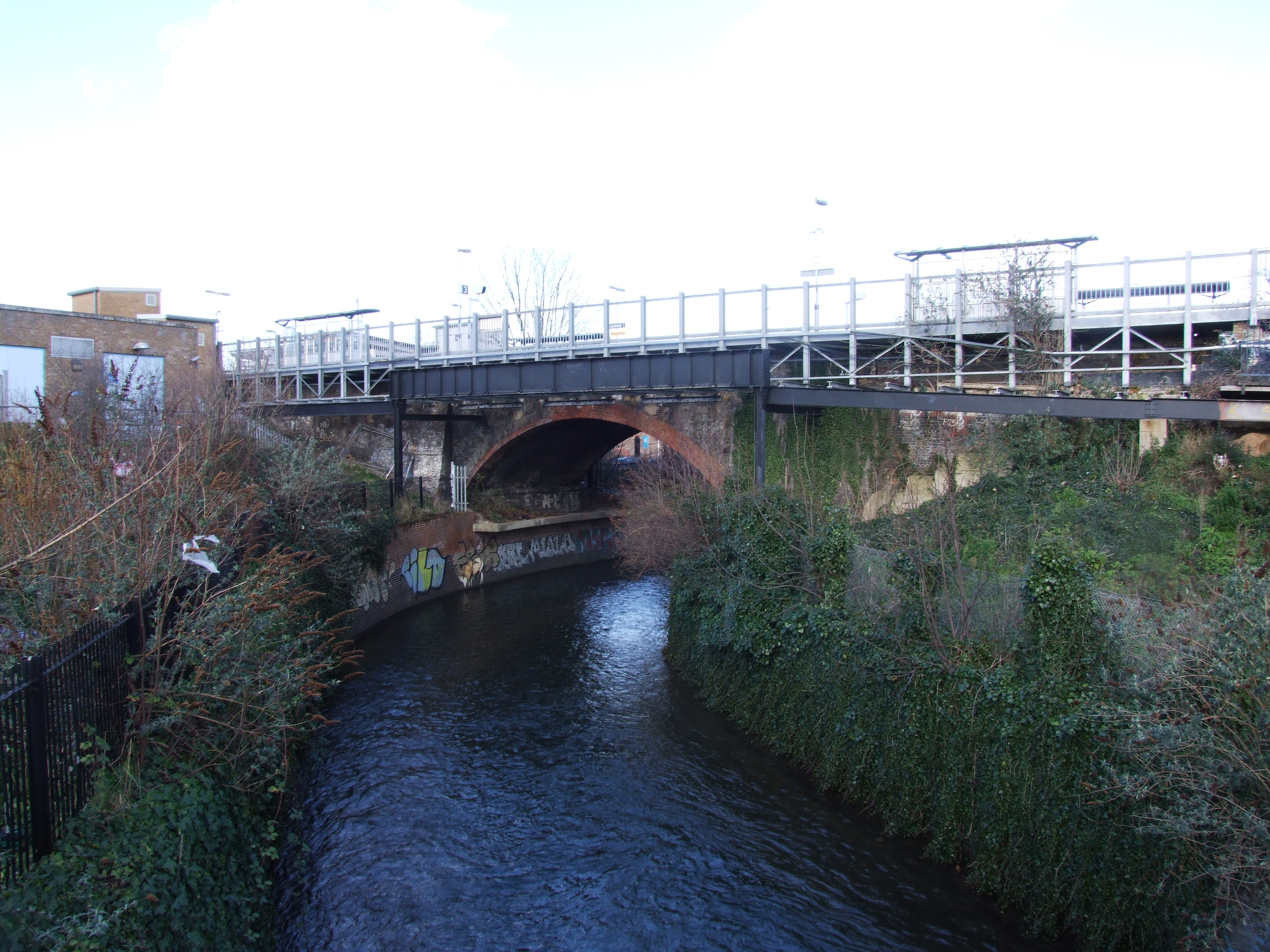
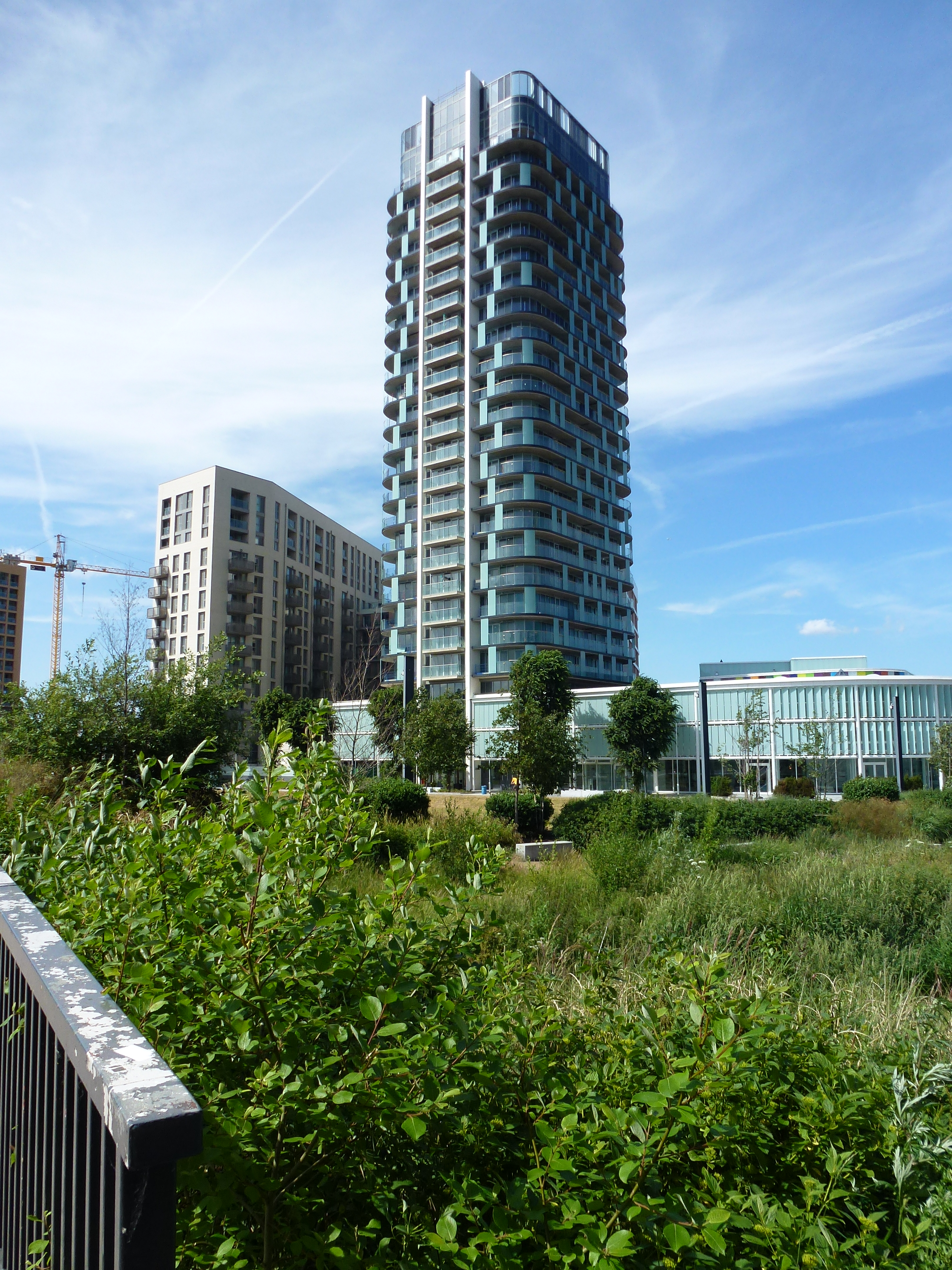
- Lewisham at night Lewisham Market Belmont Hill Lewisham station River Quaggy Renaissance Tower

- Location within Greater London
- Population: 60,573 (Ladywell, Lewisham Central, Lee Green and Blackheath wards 2011)
- OS grid reference: TQ385755
- London borough: Lewisham
- Ceremonial county: Greater London
- Region: London
- Country: England
- Sovereign state: United Kingdom
- Post town: LONDON
- Postcode district: SE13
- Dialling code: 020
- Police: Metropolitan
- Fire: London
- Ambulance: London
- UK Parliament: Lewisham North Lewisham West and East Dulwich
- London Assembly: Greenwich and Lewisham

Lewisham (/ˈluːɪʃəm/ LOO-ish-əm) is an area of southeast London, England, six miles (ten kilometres) southeast of Charing Cross. It is the principal area of the London Borough of Lewisham, and was within the historic county of Kent until 1889. It is identified in the London Plan as one of 35 major centres in Greater London, with a large shopping centre and street market. Lewisham had a population of 60,573 in 2011.

== History ==
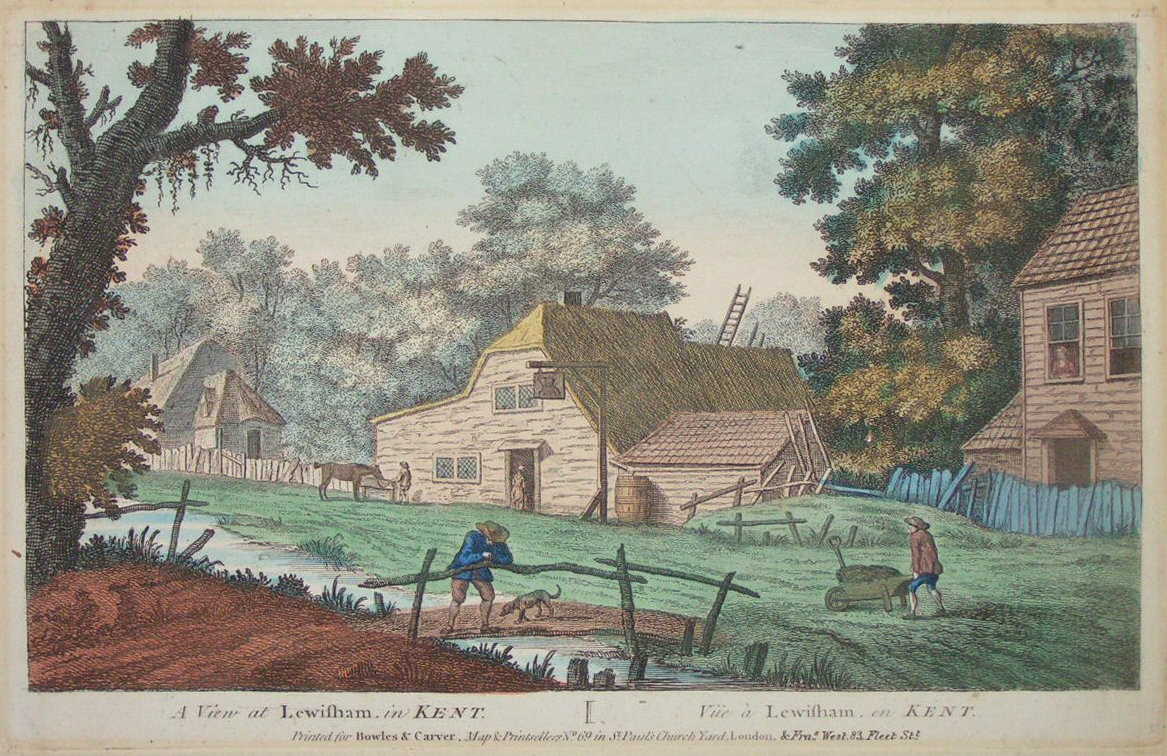
'A View of Lewisham' (1770) by John Cleveley Junior

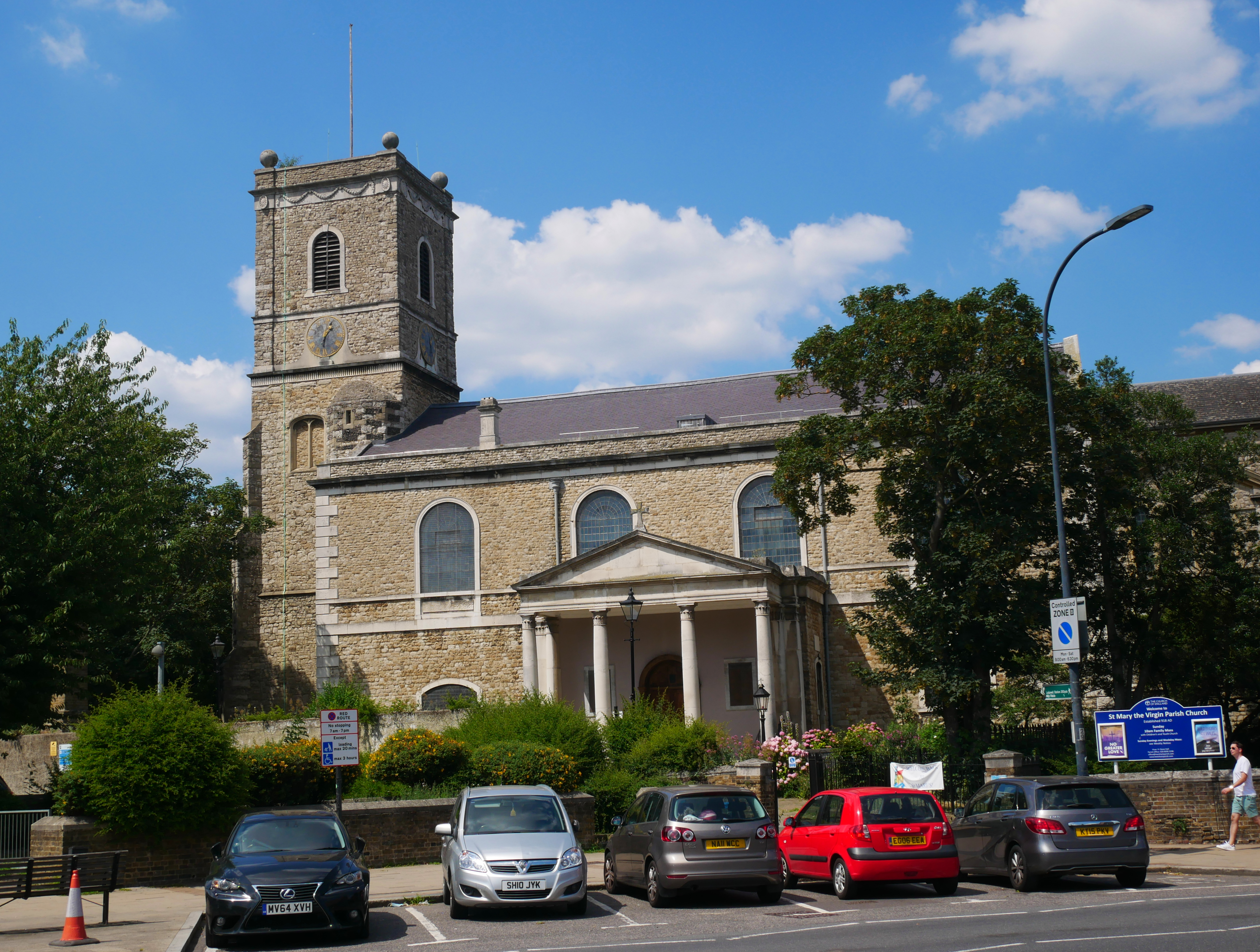
The medieval Church of Saint Mary the Virgin in Lewisham

The earliest written reference to Lewisham – Old English: liofshema – is from a charter from 862 which established the boundaries with neighbouring Bromley.

Lewisham is sometimes said to have been founded, according to Bede, by a pagan Jute, Leof, who settled (by burning his boat) near St Mary's Church (Ladywell) where the ground was drier, in the 6th century, but there seems to be no solid source for this speculation, and there is no such passage in Bede's history.

As to the etymology of the name, Daniel Lysons (1796) wrote:

"In the most ancient Saxon records this place is called Levesham, that is, the house among the meadows; leswe, læs, læse, or læsew, in the Saxon, signifies a meadow, and ham, a dwelling. A Latin legal record, dated 1440, mentions a place in Kent as Levesham which may refer to Lewisham. It is now written, as well in parochial and other records as in common usage, Lewisham."

"Leofshema" was an important settlement at the confluence of the rivers Quaggy (from Farnborough) and Ravensbourne (Caesar's Well, Keston), so the village expanded north into the wetter area as drainage techniques improved.

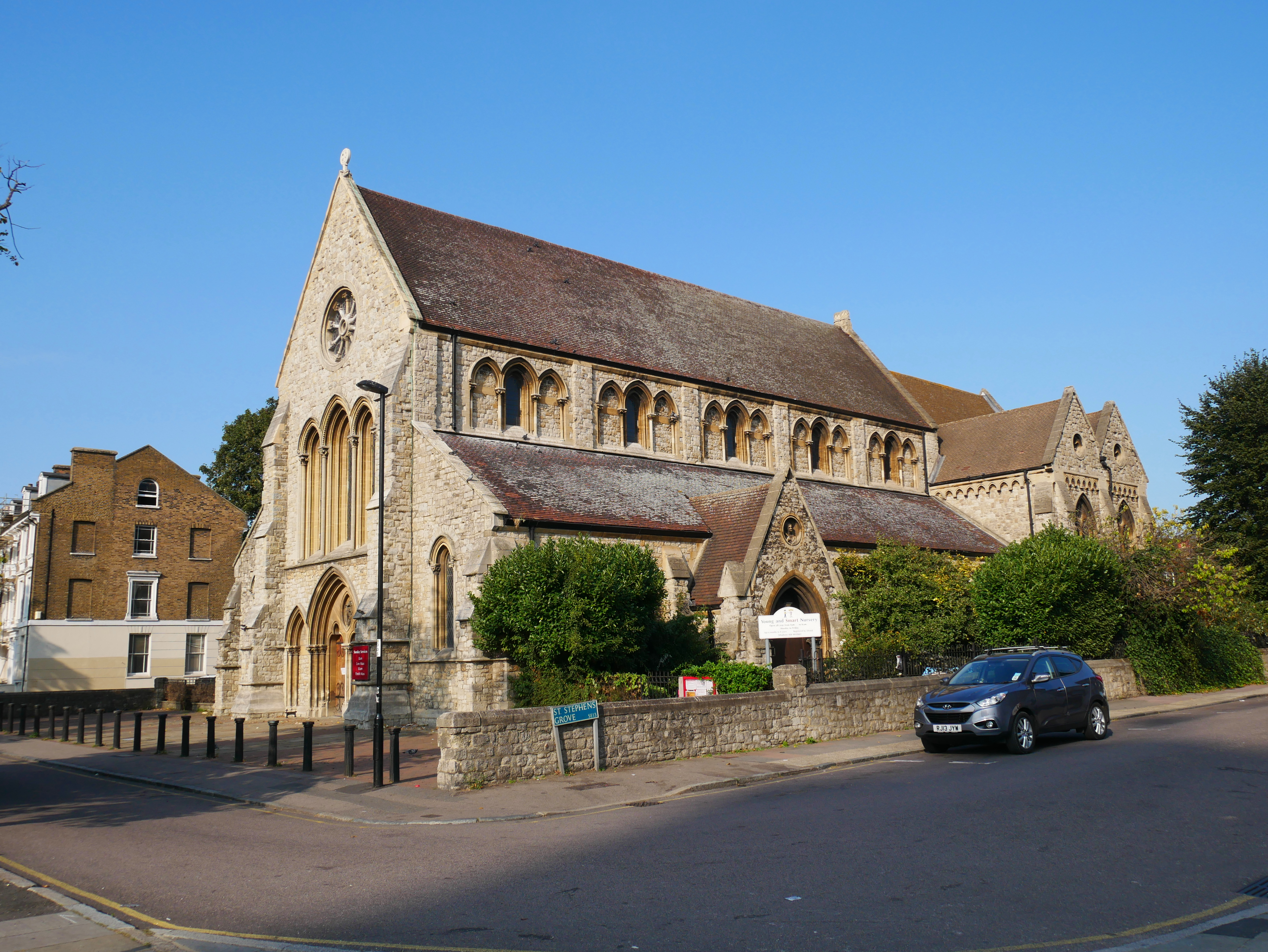
The 19th-century Church of St Stephen in Lewisham

King Alfred was Lord of the Manor of Lewisham, as is celebrated by a plaque in Lewisham Library.

The Manor of Lewisham, with its appendages of Greenwich and Combe, was given by Elthruda, King Alfred's niece, to the Saint Peter's Abbey, Ghent in a Charter dated 18 September around 918, of which Lewisham then became a cell, or an alien priory. This grant is said to have been confirmed by King Edgar in 964, and by Edward the Confessor in 1044, with the addition of many privileges.

In the mid-17th century, the then vicar of Lewisham, Abraham Colfe, built a grammar school, a primary school and six almshouses for the inhabitants.

In the 17th century the Manor of Lewisham was purchased by George Legge, later Baron Dartmouth. His son William was raised by Queen Anne to several positions of honour and trust, and was a member of her privy council; and on 5 September 1711, was ennobled as Viscount Lewisham, and Earl of Dartmouth. His grandson George, Lord Dartmouth, obtained the privilege of holding a fair twice a year, and a market twice a week, upon Blackheath in the parish. The fair used to be held on 12 May and 11 October, but in 1772 it was discontinued, (except for the sale of cattle) by the Earl of Dartmouth, as lord of the manor.

The village of Lewisham had its nucleus in its southern part, around the parish church of St Mary, towards the present site of University Hospital Lewisham. The centre migrated north with the coming of the North Kent line to Dartford in 1849, encouraging commuter housing. The Official Illustrated Guide to South-Eastern and North and Mid-Kent Railways of June 1863, by George Measom, describes Lewisham as follows: "Lewisham Station, situated on the slope of an eminence amidst picturesque scenery, beautiful green meadows rising abruptly to the summit of the hill on the left, dotted with handsome residences and gardens, while the Common is seen intersected by various crossroads and studded with country inns and houses on the low ground or valley to the right. The area of the parish is 5,789 acres... Lord of the manor, the Earl of Dartmouth to whom it gives the title Viscount."

Lewisham was administratively part of Kent until 1889, and then formed part of the Metropolitan Borough of Lewisham in the County of London until 1965.

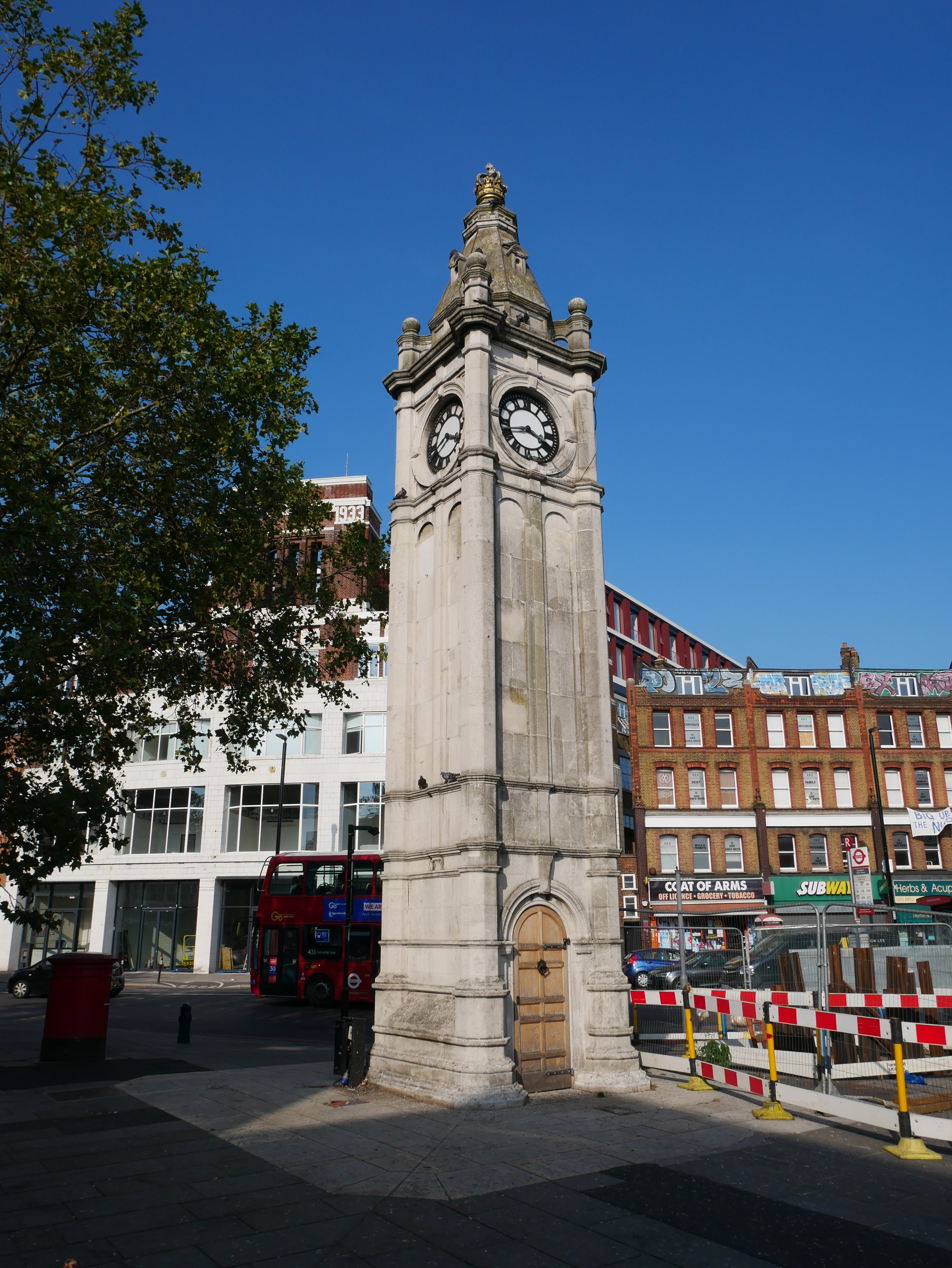
The 19th-century clock tower in Lewisham

The town centre was hit by a V-1 flying bomb in 1944: there were over 300 casualties including 51 fatalities, and it devastated the high street, which was fully restored by the mid-1950s. This horrific event is commemorated by a plaque outside the Lewisham Shopping Centre (opened in 1977). The plaque was on the pavement outside the Marks & Spencer store in the main shopping precinct. However, suffering wear and tear, the local authority arranged for it to be mounted to the façade. In 1955 Sainsbury's opened a store in Lewisham which was reported to be Europe's largest self-service supermarket, with 7,500 square feet of retail space, although the one now incorporated in the 1977 shopping centre is much smaller. The area at the north end of the High Street was pedestrianised in 1994. It is home to a daily street market and a local landmark, the clock tower, completed in 1900 to commemorate Queen Victoria's Diamond Jubilee in 1897. The police station, opened in 2004 to replace the station in Ladywell, is one of the largest in Europe.

Lewisham Cricket Club was one of the most prestigious London sides during the Victorian era. From 1864 they played at Lewisham Cricket Ground, which lay north of Ladywell Road, until its closure later in the 19th century. Lewisham Swimming Club was also very successful, with several of its members representing England at water polo and other gymkhana events. During the First World War, Lewisham Hospital's infirmary became the Lewisham Military Hospital, and during the Second World War the hospital was hit by a V-1 flying bomb, which destroyed two wards, injured 70 people and killed one nurse.

Lewisham is also the site of one of the worst disasters on the British railway network in the 20th century. On 4 December 1957 a crowded steam-hauled passenger express headed for the Kent coast overran signals at danger in thick fog near St Johns station and crashed into a stationary electric train for the Hayes branch line. The force of the impact brought down an overhead railway bridge onto the wreckage below. An electric multiple unit about to cross the bridge towards Nunhead managed to pull up in time. Ninety passengers and crew died in the accident.

In 1969, Lewisham was identified in the Greater London Council's Greater London Development Plan as one of the top tier Major Strategic Centres. However, the Major Strategic Centres were identified based on their exiting retail trade turnover and their relationship with the Primary Road Network was mostly coincidental in that only some of them coincided with the primary network.

In 1977, the Battle of Lewisham saw 500 members of the National Front, who were attempting to march through the area, and their police escort, attacked by more than 4,000 counter-demonstrators.

The Docklands Light Railway was extended to Lewisham in 1999. Molesworth Street widened to create a bypass around the shopping area as part of the "Lewisham 2000" project, including sculptures by John Maine. This saw the demolition of the 1932 art deco Lewisham Odeon which had also provided a live music venue hosting artists from Johnny Cash to the Rolling Stones.

The 2010s and early 2020s saw the construction of many high-rise residential buildings around Loampit Vale and Molesworth Street. The former roundabout by Lewisham station was replaced with an "H" junction to release land for further private development. This was to be supported by the cancelled Bakerloo Line extension to Lewisham.

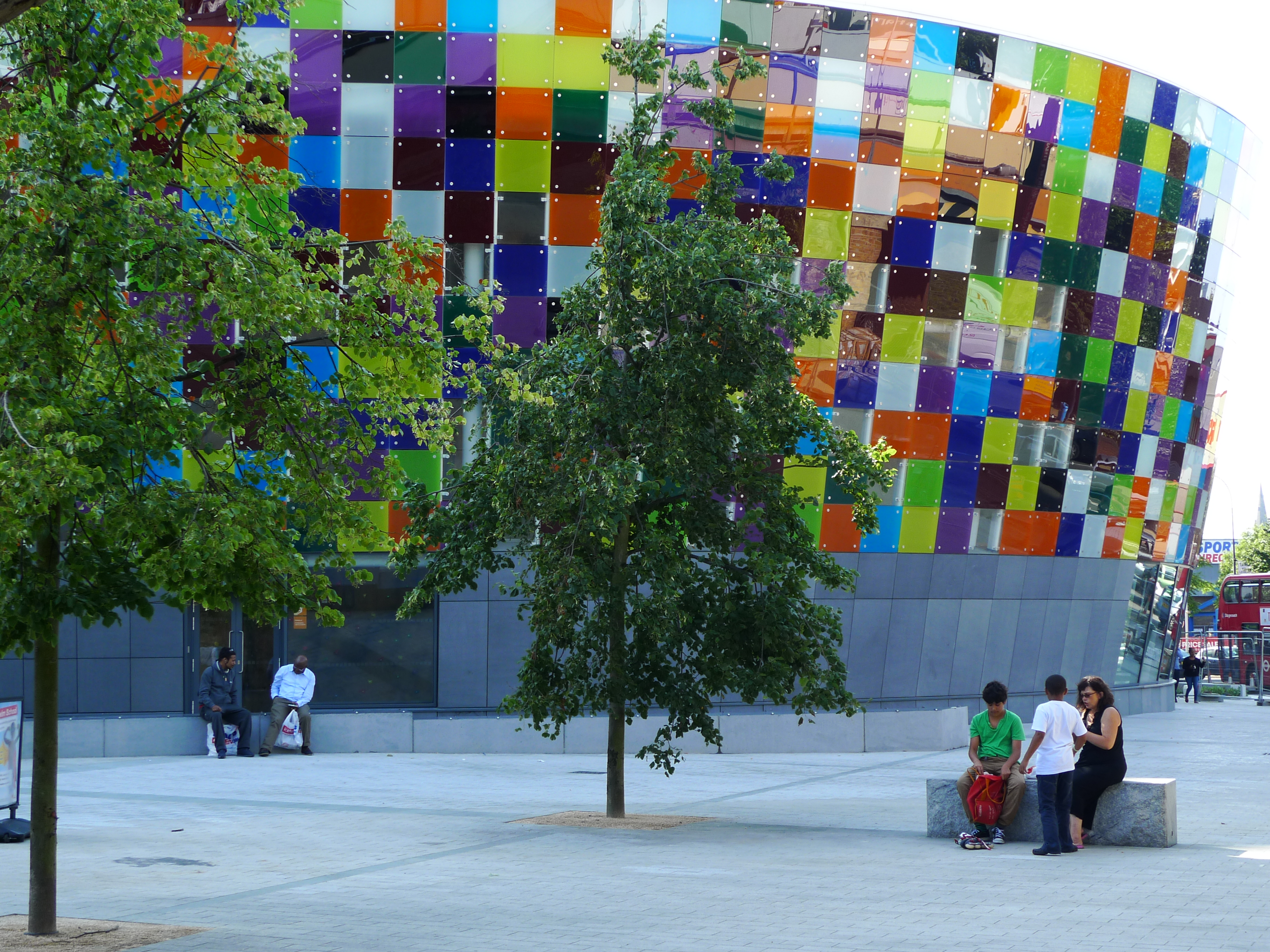
Razzle Dazzle Boogie Woogie by Phil Coy (2013), Lewisham. Ten colour sound reactive backlit glass façade, based on digital camouflage pattern.

In 2013 the Glass Mill Leisure Centre opened opposite Lewisham station with its façade defined by a large scale embedded kinetic artwork "Razzle Dazzle Boogie Woogie" by the artist Phil Coy. The project was awarded the Best Built Project – Community Scale Scheme in the London Planning Awards 2013/14.

== Governance ==
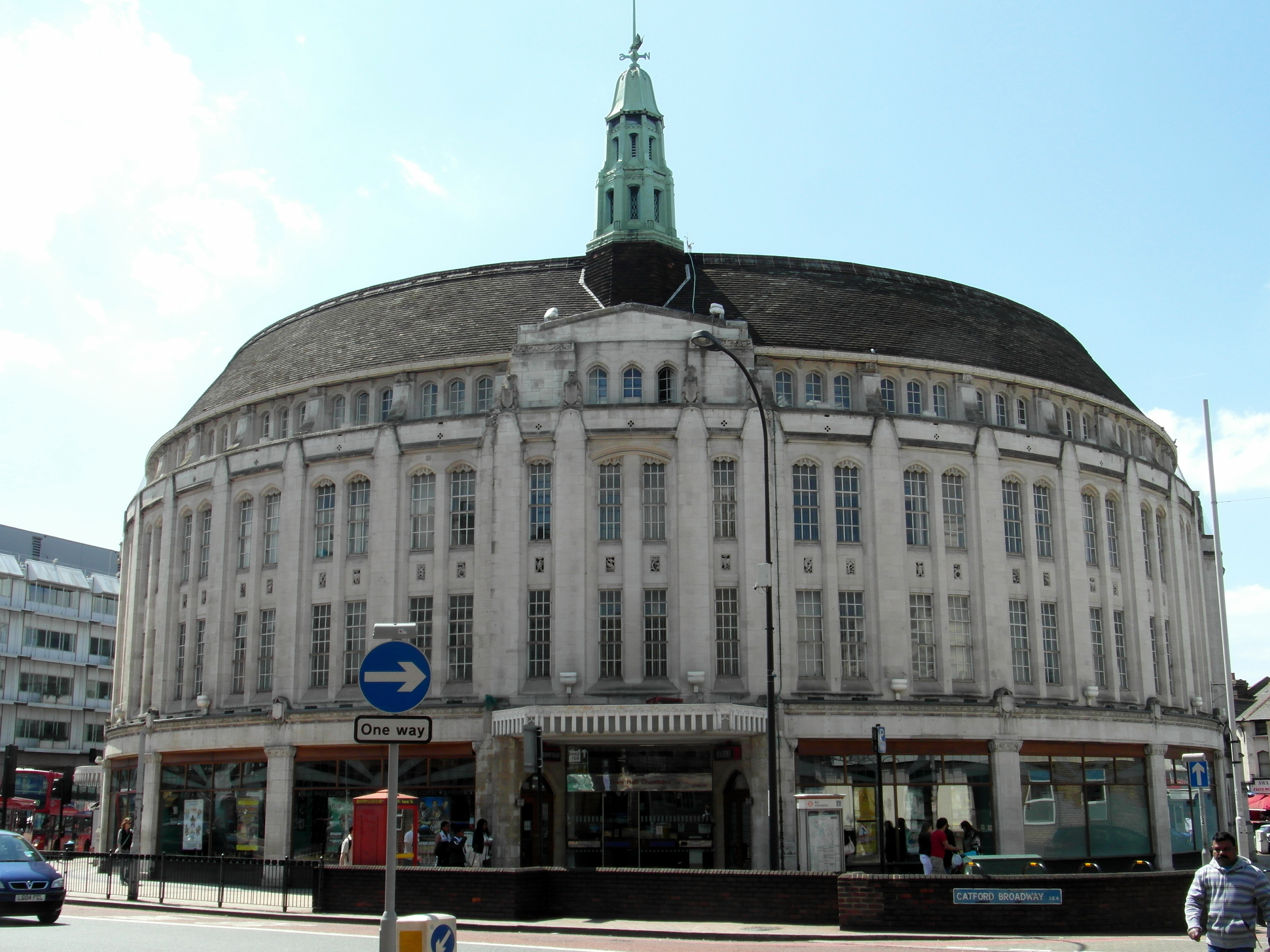
Lewisham Town Hall, completed in 1932

A map showing the wards of Lewisham Metropolitan Borough as they appeared in 1916

The parish of Lewisham was governed by a vestry; and from 1855 until 1900 by the Lewisham District Board of Works, in combination with Penge. Following the London Government Act 1899, the County of London was split into 28 metropolitan boroughs in 1900. Lewisham, with the parish of Lee, became part of the Metropolitan Borough of Lewisham. In 1965, under the London Government Act 1963, the current 32 London boroughs were formed and today Lewisham is part of the London Borough of Lewisham.

Lewisham London Borough Council is based in Catford. The current directly elected mayor is Brenda Dacres. In the London Assembly, the London Borough of Lewisham is joined with the Royal Borough of Greenwich to form the Greenwich and Lewisham constituency, with the current Assembly Member being Len Duvall. For Westminster elections, Lewisham is covered by the Lewisham North constituency, whose Member of Parliament (MP) as of 2024 is Vicky Foxcroft.

== Commercial area and amenities ==
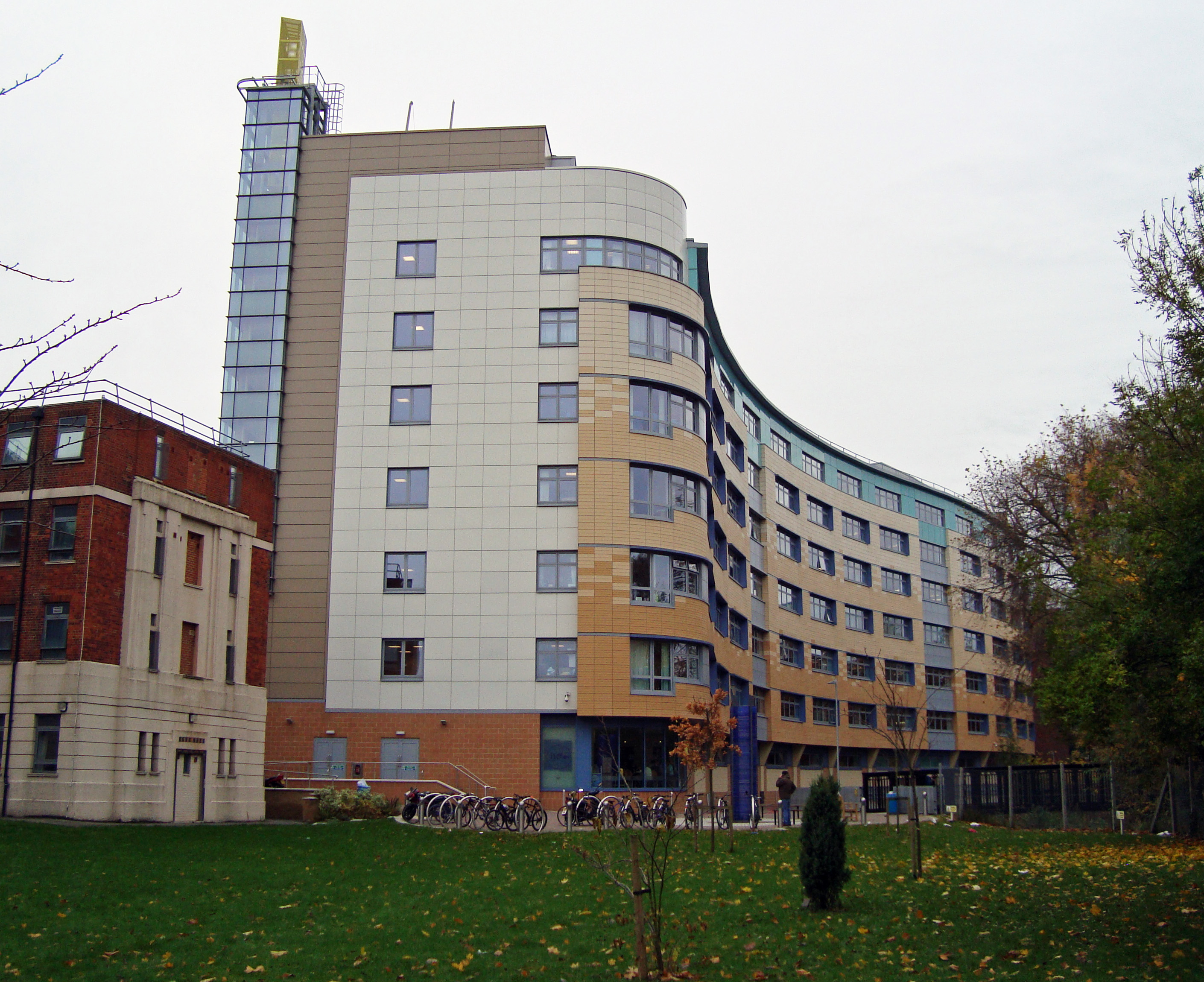
University Hospital Lewisham, Riverside Building

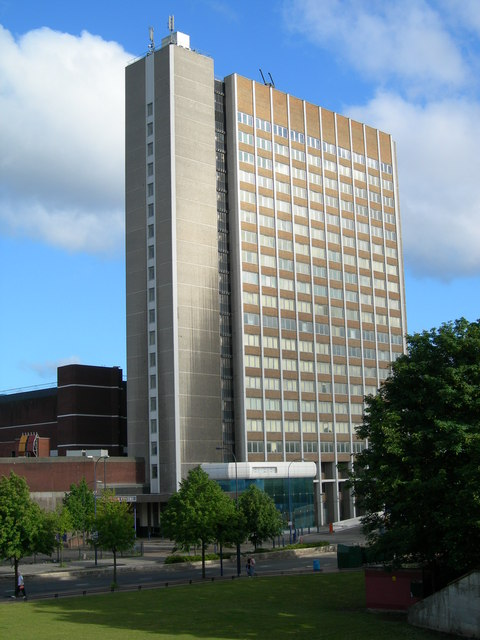
Lewisham House, 25 Molesworth Street

Lewisham's commercial area is one of the largest in south-east London. Lewisham Shopping Centre, opened in 1977, has 70 stores and is over 330,000 square feet. The centre is between Molesworth Street (a dual carriageway section of the A21) and Lewisham High Street. Lewisham Market and the Central Library are outside the shopping centre in the High Street. Also part of the complex is the Lewisham House office tower, once the tallest building in the borough and formerly occupied by Citibank. There are proposals to either demolish this tower, or convert it into flats.

Lewisham has a bowling alley and the Glassmill Swimming pool and Gym.

Lewisham has a number of parks, such as Hilly Fields and Lewisham Park.

For 14 years between 2001 and 2015, Lewisham was the only London Borough not to have a cinema. Lewisham once had many cinemas, such as the Lewisham Odeon. In 1930 there were 30 venues showing films. As of 2022, there is only one cinema operating in the borough: Catford Mews.

Opened in 1894, University Hospital Lewisham is a National Health Service, acute hospital run by the Lewisham and Greenwich NHS Trust serving the whole London Borough of Lewisham as well as some surrounding areas. In July 2012 the government recommended that Lewisham's Accident & Emergency ward should be closed, with emergency provision transferred to Queen Elizabeth Hospital, London. However, there was a strong campaign in Lewisham against the proposed closure, including a march on 24 November 2012, and a successful legal challenge. In July 2013, the High Court ruled that the closure of Lewisham A&E could not go ahead. In October 2013, the Court of Appeal ruled that Health Secretary Jeremy Hunt did not have power to implement cuts at Lewisham Hospital.

== Education ==
Secondary schools in Lewisham include:

- Addey and Stanhope School
- Bonus Pastor Catholic College
- Conisborough College
- Deptford Green School
- Forest Hill School (Boys only)
- Haberdashers' Aske's Hatcham College
- Haberdashers' Knights Academy
- Prendergast School
- Prendergast Ladywell School
- Prendergast Vale School
- St Matthew Academy
- Sedgehill School
- Sydenham School
- Trinity Church of England School

== Transport ==
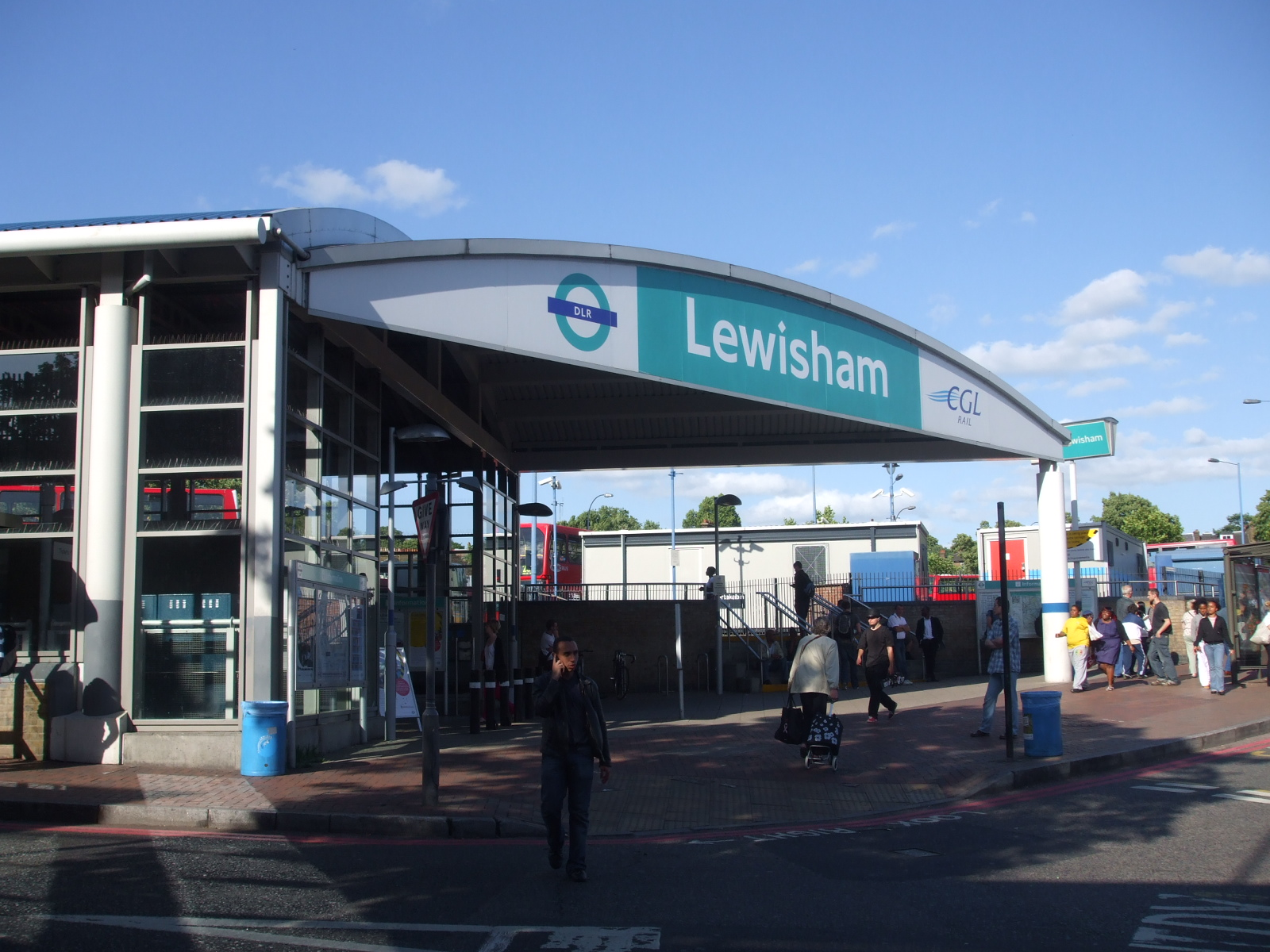
Lewisham DLR entrance

=== National Rail ===
Lewisham station provides the area with Southeastern services to London Victoria, London Charing Cross, London Cannon Street, Dartford via Woolwich Arsenal, Dartford via Bexleyheath, Gravesend via Bexleyheath, Slade Green via Bexleyheath, Slade Green via Sidcup, Hayes and Orpington.

=== DLR ===
Lewisham station also provides DLR services to Bank via Canary Wharf.

=== Buses ===
Lewisham is served by many London Buses routes.

- 21 to Newington Green via New Cross, London Bridge and Moorgate
- 47 to Bellingham via Catford or to Shoreditch via Canada Water and London Bridge (24 Hour service)
- 54 to Elmers End via Catford and Beckenham or to Woolwich via Blackheath
- 75 to Croydon via Catford, Penge and South Norwood
- 89 to Slade Green via Blackheath, Welling and Bexleyheath
- 108 to Stratford via Blackheath, North Greenwich, Poplar and Bow (24 Hour service)
- 122 to Crystal Palace via Brockley, Forest Hill and Sydenham or to Plumstead via Eltham and Woolwich
- 136 to Elephant & Castle via New Cross and Peckham or to Grove Park via Catford
- 178 to Woolwich via Kidbrooke
- 180 to Belvedere via Greenwich and Woolwich
- 181 to Grove Park via Catford
- 185 to Victoria via Catford, Dulwich and Camberwell
- 199 to Bellingham via Catford or to Canada Water via Greenwich
- 208 to Orpington via Catford and Bromley
- 225 to Canada Water via New Cross or to Hither Green
- 261 to Locksbottom via Grove Park and Bromley
- 273 to Petts Wood via Grove Park and Chislehurst
- 284 to Grove Park via Catford
- 321 to Foots Cray via Eltham and Sidcup or to New Cross (24 Hour service)
- 380 to Belmarsh Prison via Blackheath and Woolwich
- 436 to Battersea via New Cross, Peckham and Camberwell
- P4 to Brixton via Brockley and Dulwich
- N21 to Bexleyheath via Eltham or to Trafalgar Square via New Cross and London Bridge (Night Bus)
- N89 to Erith via Blackheath, Welling and Bexleyheath or to Trafalgar Square via New Cross, Peckham, Elephant & Castle and Blackfriars (Night Bus)
- N136 to Oxford Circus via New Cross, Peckham, Camberwell, Victoria and Trafalgar Square or to Chislehurst via Catford and Grove Park (Night Bus)
- N199 to St Mary Cray via Catford, Bromley and Petts Wood or to Trafalgar Square via Greenwich, Canada Water and London Bridge (Night Bus)

== Redevelopment ==
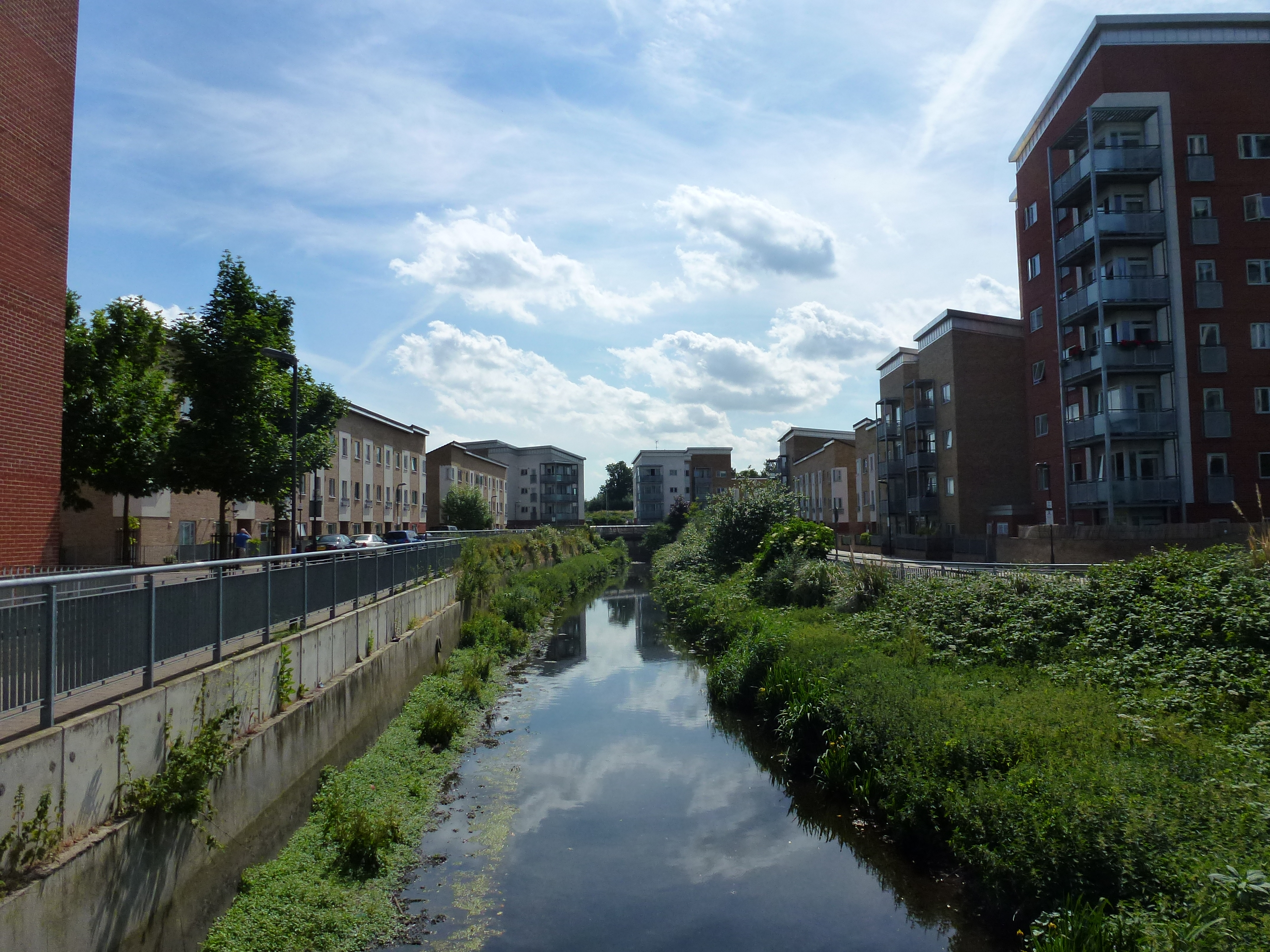
Cornmill Gardens development around the River Ravensbourne, 2013

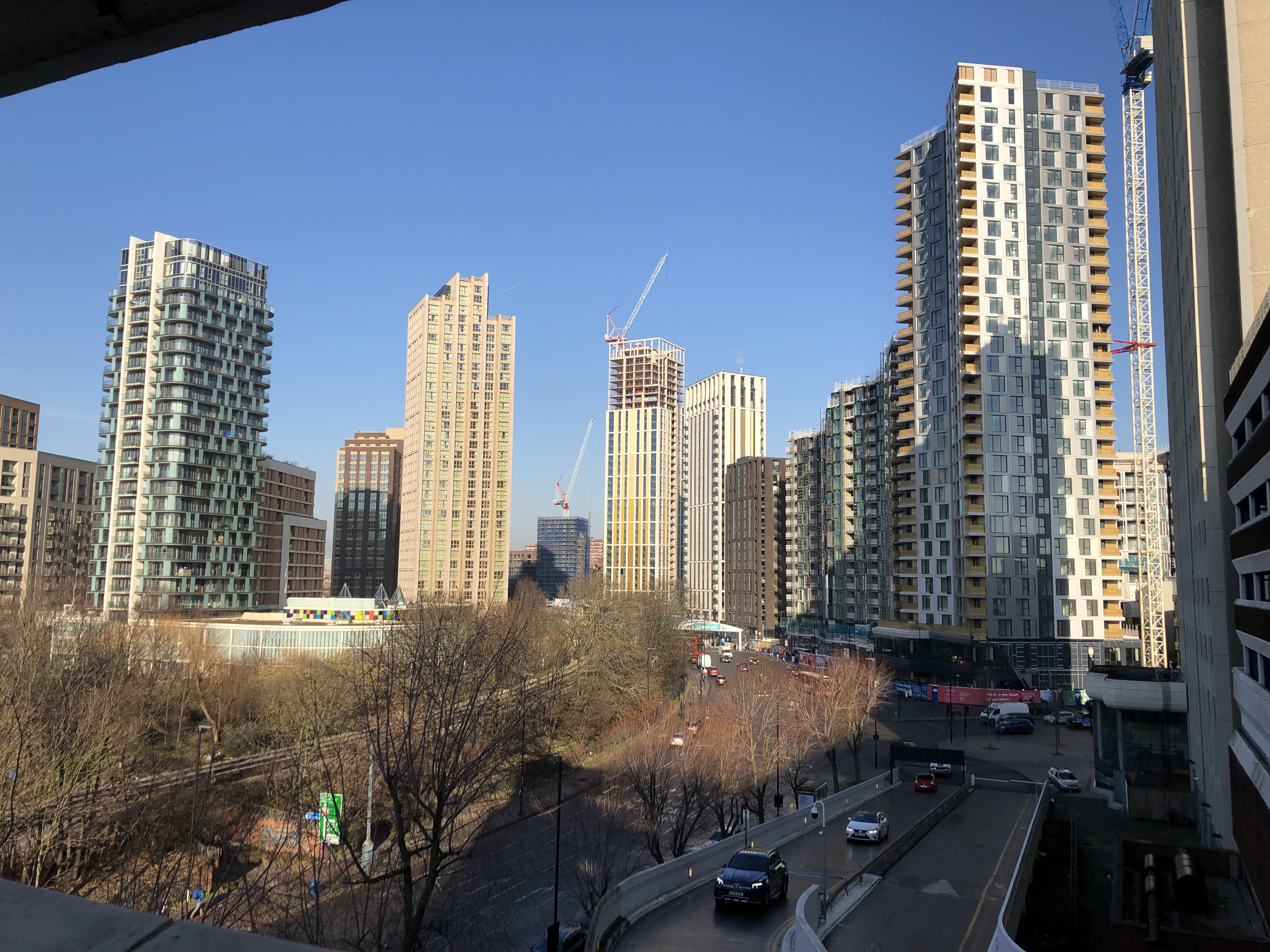
New developments around Lewisham station

Lewisham London Borough Council's local development plan was intended to improve Lewisham's town centre to become a metropolitan centre to rival Bromley, Croydon and Kingston upon Thames.

There is a skyscraper adjacent to the shopping centre which used to be owned by Citibank until they moved to the Docklands which may be converted to residential.

There are four major development sites around on Loampit Vale:

- The Renaissance development comprises flats in buildings from five to 24 storeys, including private and L&Q social housing, as well as the new Glass Mill Leisure Centre, which opened in 2013 and replaced the Ladywell leisure centre.
- Lewisham Gateway is a much-delayed redevelopment site bounded by the DLR station, Lewisham High Street, the shopping centre and the railway to Blackheath. The highway layout has been changed from a roundabout to two signalised junctions, while the rivers Ravensbourne and Quaggy have been re-routed. The development is intended to include shops, restaurants, bars, cafes, leisure facilities and up to 800 homes. The first phase of construction started in May 2014 with a 15 and 25-story residential building east of the DLR station.
- Thurston Road industrial estate had planning consent granted in 2008; however, the development has been heavily delayed. The development was completed in 2016 and includes L&Q social housing. The scheme is a mixed used site, which includes residential and commercial buildings of between two and 17 storeys, as well a car park.
- The former Sherwood Court industrial estate is now the Chapter student housing scheme.
- Lewisham Shopping Centre and surrounding areas will be redeveloped to provide 1700 new homes, a revamped shopping centre high street and a green meadow running through the middle.

== Notable people ==
Among those who were born or have lived in Lewisham are:

- Joe Absolom (actor) born and brought up in Lewisham
- Merky ACE (grime music artist) born and brought up in Lewisham
- Ginger Baker (drummer of Cream) born and brought up in Lewisham
- Natasha Bedingfield (singer/songwriter) brought up in Lewisham
- Rosa May Billinghurst (suffragette) lived in Lewisham
- D-Block Europe (hip hop collective) born and brought up in Lewisham
- Yannick Bolasie (footballer), brought up in Lewisham
- Herbert Burden youngest soldier to be executed by the British Army in World War I, born in Lewisham
- Kate Bush (musician) lived in Brockley and Lewisham
- Ann Batten Cristall (1769–1848), poet and schoolteacher
- General Sir John Crocker (British Army general, service in World War I and World War II), born in Lewisham
- Khadijah Dare, who joined the Islamic State
- Hughroy Currie (Boxer), British Heavyweight Champion in 1985–86. Lived in Catford, Brockley and briefly Bromley.
- Leland Lewis Duncan (photographer, writer) born in Lewisham
- Franz Goedecker (merchant and artist), lived in Lewisham
- Kenneth Hall (artist) born in Lewisham
- Malcolm Hardee (comedian) lived in Blackheath and was born in Lewisham
- Danielle Harold (actress best known for playing Lola in Eastenders) born and raised in Lewisham
- Keeley Hazell (page-3 girl & model) born in Lewisham
- Jessica Hynes (actress and comedian) born in Lewisham
- Greg James (TV and radio presenter) born in Lewisham
- Eman Kellam (TV presenter) born and brought up in Lewisham
- Frank King (cricketer) born in Lewisham
- Kwes (record music producer and Warp recording artist) born and brought up in Lewisham
- Elsa Lanchester (Anglo-American actress) born in Lewisham
- Lillie Langtry (actress) lived in Wickham Way, Lewisham
- Neal Lawson (politician) was born in Lewisham
- Jim Legxacy (rapper) born and brought up in Lewisham
- Angie Le Mar (comedian, radio broadcaster) was born and brought up in Lewisham
- Emma Leslie (English writer, 1838–1909) lived in Lewisham
- Delroy Lindo (actor) born in Lewisham
- Marie Lloyd (entertainer) lived in Lewisham and New Cross
- Ruben Loftus-Cheek (footballer)
- Alexander McQueen (designer) born in Lewisham
- Josh Maja (footballer), born in Lewisham
- Russ Millions (rapper) born and brought up in Lewisham
- MNEK (musician) was born in Lewisham
- P Money (Grime music artist) born and brought up in Lewisham
- Edith Nesbit (writer) lived in Blackheath, Grove Park and Lewisham
- Eddie Nketiah (footballer), born in Lewisham
- Novelist (Grime music artist) born and brought up in Lewisham
- Gary Oldman (actor) born and raised in New Cross
- William Page (historian and general editor of the Victoria County History) lived in Lewisham from 1875 until he emigrated to Queensland in 1881
- Jonathan Palmer former Formula One driver and commentator
- Mica Paris (musician) lived in Lewisham
- Muriel Pavlow actress, born in Lewisham
- Montague Phillips (Chemist) lived in Lewisham
- Gladys Powers (centenarian), born in Lewisham
- Maxi Priest (musician), born and raised in Lewisham
- Luke Pritchard (musician), born in Lewisham
- Louise Redknapp (singer, TV presenter and former wife of footballer Jamie Redknapp), born in Lewisham
- Kieran Richardson (footballer) lived in Lewisham
- David Rocastle (footballer) born and raised in Lewisham and Brockley. Attended primary school in Brockley
- Sidi Bou Said (band) consists of four women from Lewisham
- Alan Saville (British prehistorian worked extensively on the Grime's Graves flint mine in Norfolk) born in Lewisham in 1946
- Doris Stokes (spirit-medium) lived in Lewisham
- Doveton Sturdee British Admiral of the Fleet, born in Lewisham
- David Sylvian (musician) lived in Lewisham.
- Kae Tempest (spoken word performer, poet, recording artist, novelist and playwright) grew up in Brockley
- Sid Vicious (musician), born in Lewisham
- Troy von Scheibner (magician), born in Lewisham
- Eamonn Walker (TV and film actor, husband of Sandra Walker), born in Lewisham
- Richard Walsh (actor), born in Lewisham
- Conrad Williams Commonwealth Games 2014 gold medalist
- Ian Wright (footballer) lived in Lewisham and Brockley
- Shaun Wright-Phillips (footballer and son of Ian Wright) grew up in Brockley
- Henry Williamson (author), born and raised in Lewisham
- Bill Wyman, bass player of the Rolling Stones, born in Lewisham Hospital

== Geography ==
Almost all of the SE13 postcode district, which is associated with Lewisham is within the London Borough of Lewisham, except for the Coldbath Estate and part of the Orchard Estate along Lewisham Road, which are covered by the Royal Borough of Greenwich. The town includes areas such as St Johns and Hither Green, as well as Lee and Ladywell to the south and east.

=== Climate ===
The nearest Met Office climate station is based in Greenwich Park:

Climate data for London (LHR), (Note: Averages are taken from Heathrow, and extremes are taken from stations across London.) elevation: 25 m (82 ft), 1991–2020 normals
| Month | Jan | Feb | Mar | Apr | May | Jun | Jul | Aug | Sep | Oct | Nov | Dec | Year |
|---|---|---|---|---|---|---|---|---|---|---|---|---|---|
| Record high °C (°F) | 17.2 (63.0) | 21.2 (70.2) | 24.5 (76.1) | 29.4 (84.9) | 35.1 (95.2) | 36.4 (97.5) | 40.2 (104.4) | 38.1 (100.6) | 35.0 (95.0) | 29.5 (85.1) | 21.1 (70.0) | 17.4 (63.3) | 40.2 (104.4) |
| Mean maximum °C (°F) | 13.3 (55.9) | 14.3 (57.7) | 17.6 (63.7) | 22.2 (72.0) | 26.2 (79.2) | 29.4 (84.9) | 31.2 (88.2) | 30.6 (87.1) | 26.2 (79.2) | 21.0 (69.8) | 16.7 (62.1) | 13.9 (57.0) | 32.6 (90.7) |
| Mean daily maximum °C (°F) | 8.4 (47.1) | 9.0 (48.2) | 11.7 (53.1) | 15.0 (59.0) | 18.4 (65.1) | 21.6 (70.9) | 23.9 (75.0) | 23.4 (74.1) | 20.2 (68.4) | 15.8 (60.4) | 11.5 (52.7) | 8.8 (47.8) | 15.7 (60.3) |
| Daily mean °C (°F) | 5.6 (42.1) | 5.8 (42.4) | 7.9 (46.2) | 10.5 (50.9) | 13.7 (56.7) | 16.8 (62.2) | 19.0 (66.2) | 18.7 (65.7) | 15.9 (60.6) | 12.3 (54.1) | 8.4 (47.1) | 5.9 (42.6) | 11.7 (53.1) |
| Mean daily minimum °C (°F) | 2.7 (36.9) | 2.7 (36.9) | 4.1 (39.4) | 6.0 (42.8) | 9.1 (48.4) | 12.0 (53.6) | 14.2 (57.6) | 14.1 (57.4) | 11.6 (52.9) | 8.8 (47.8) | 5.3 (41.5) | 3.1 (37.6) | 7.8 (46.0) |
| Mean minimum °C (°F) | −3.7 (25.3) | −3.3 (26.1) | −1.5 (29.3) | 0.4 (32.7) | 3.3 (37.9) | 7.3 (45.1) | 10.2 (50.4) | 9.2 (48.6) | 6.4 (43.5) | 2.4 (36.3) | −1.3 (29.7) | −3.4 (25.9) | −5.3 (22.5) |
| Record low °C (°F) | −16.1 (3.0) | −13.9 (7.0) | −8.9 (16.0) | −5.6 (21.9) | −3.1 (26.4) | −0.6 (30.9) | 3.9 (39.0) | 2.1 (35.8) | 1.4 (34.5) | −5.5 (22.1) | −7.1 (19.2) | −17.4 (0.7) | −17.4 (0.7) |
| Average precipitation mm (inches) | 58.8 (2.31) | 45.0 (1.77) | 38.8 (1.53) | 42.3 (1.67) | 45.9 (1.81) | 47.3 (1.86) | 45.8 (1.80) | 52.8 (2.08) | 49.6 (1.95) | 65.1 (2.56) | 66.6 (2.62) | 57.1 (2.25) | 615.0 (24.21) |
| Average precipitation days (≥ 1.0 mm) | 11.5 | 9.5 | 8.5 | 8.8 | 8.0 | 8.3 | 7.9 | 8.4 | 7.9 | 10.8 | 11.2 | 10.8 | 111.7 |
| Average relative humidity (%) | 80 | 77 | 70 | 65 | 67 | 65 | 65 | 69 | 73 | 78 | 81 | 81 | 73 |
| Average dew point °C (°F) | 3 (37) | 2 (36) | 2 (36) | 4 (39) | 7 (45) | 10 (50) | 12 (54) | 12 (54) | 10 (50) | 9 (48) | 6 (43) | 3 (37) | 7 (44) |
| Mean monthly sunshine hours | 61.1 | 78.8 | 124.5 | 176.7 | 207.5 | 208.4 | 217.8 | 202.1 | 157.1 | 115.2 | 70.7 | 55.0 | 1,674.8 |
| Percentage possible sunshine | 23 | 28 | 31 | 40 | 41 | 41 | 42 | 45 | 40 | 35 | 27 | 21 | 35 |
| Average ultraviolet index | 1 | 1 | 2 | 4 | 5 | 6 | 6 | 5 | 4 | 2 | 1 | 0 | 3 |
Source 1: Met OfficeRoyal Netherlands Meteorological Institute
Source 2: Weather Atlas (percent sunshine and UV Index)CEDA ArchiveTORROTime and Date See Climate of London for additional climate information.

== See also ==
- Battle of Lewisham – 1977 battle in southeast London, England
- Lewisam
- Lewisham Rail Crash – 1957 train wreck in Lewisham, London, England
- Lewisham Shopping Centre
- Lewisham Station – Docklands Light Railway and National Rail station in London, England
- Lewisham, Sydney – Named after Lewisham
- London Borough of Lewisham – Borough of London
- University Hospital Lewisham
