= Erica Pienaar =

South African-born British schoolteacher and educationalist

Dame Erica Christine Pienaar, DBE, FRSA (born 20 March 1952) is a South African-born British schoolteacher and educationalist.

Executive Head Teacher of the Leathersellers' Federation of Schools until September 2013, Dame Erica also served as a director of James Allen's Girls' School.

== Early life and education ==
Pienaar arrived in Great Britain at the age of three with her parents and elder sister in 1955 when her family emigrated from South Africa.

She was educated at Rockmount Primary School in South Norwood then attending Coloma Convent Grammar School for Girls, before going up to Goldsmiths, University of London where she graduated as BA. After further studies, she took an MBA (LSBU).

== Career ==
Pienaar began her teaching career in 1973 and taught for 40 years in South East London. She was Headmistress of Prendergast Hilly Fields College from 1998 to 2008. As of September 2009, Prendergast School became Prendergast Hilly Fields College, part of a Federation with the Crofton School, now known as Prendergast Ladywell Fields College; Prendergast Vale College joined the federation in 2011.

== Honours and awards ==
- Dame Commander of the Order of the British Empire (2014)
  - Honorary Freeman of the Borough of Lewisham (2013)
  - Freeman of the City of London (2011)

=== Appointments ===
- non-executive director of Wey Education Plc (23 February 2015–present)
- Chair of Academic Advisory Board, Wey Education Plc (31 January 2017–present)

== See also ==
- Worshipful Company of Leathersellers
