= Worshipful Company of Leathersellers =

Livery company of the City of London

Coordinates: 51.5150°N 0.0815°W

Leathersellers' Company
- Leathersellers' arms
- Motto: Soli Deo Honor et Gloria
- Location: The Leathersellers' Co., 7 St Helen's Place, London EC3A 6AB
- Date of formation: 1444
- Company association: Leather industries
- Order of precedence: 15th
- Master of company: David Barrow
- Website: www.leathersellers.org

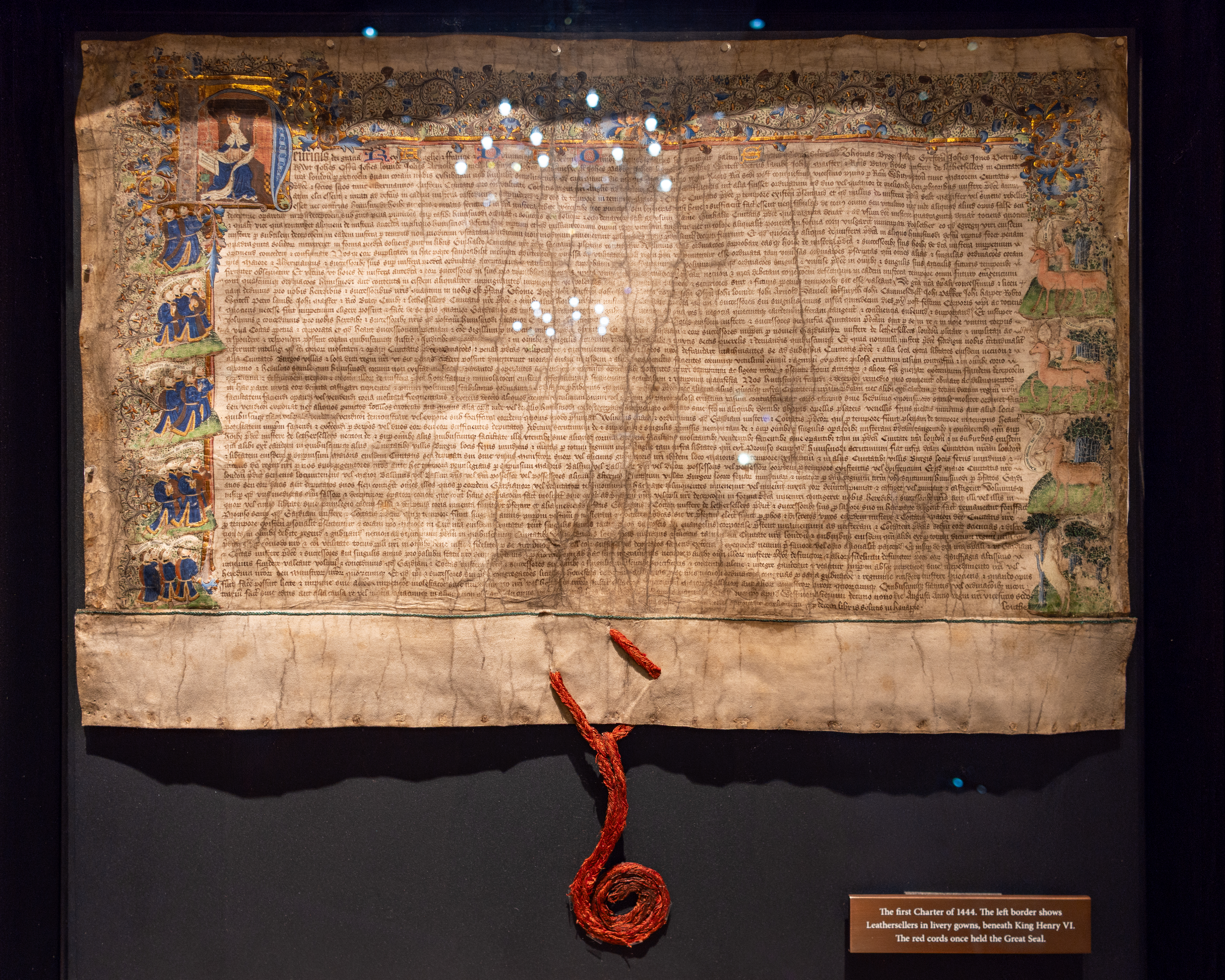
1444 royal charter from Henry VI

The Worshipful Company of Leathersellers is one of the livery companies of the City of London. The organisation originates from the latter part of the 14th century receiving its Royal Charter in 1444, and is therefore the senior leather industry-related City Livery Company.

The Leathersellers' Company ranks fifteenth in the order of precedence of City livery companies. Its motto is Soli Deo Honor et Gloria, Latin for Honour and Glory to God Alone.

== Activities ==
The Leathersellers' Company, which originally regulated leather merchants, continues to act as an advocate for the UK leather trade, together with its leather-associated City livery partners: the Cordwainers, Curriers, Girdlers, Glovers and Saddlers. Like these other livery companies, today it is primarily involved in philanthropic, charitable and educational activities.

== Schools ==
The livery company is very closely linked with the Leathersellers' Federation of Schools (formerly Prendergast School), now comprising Prendergast Ladywell School, Prendergast School and Prendergast Vale School, all located within the London Borough of Lewisham. Since the mid-seventeenth century the Company has also been closely associated with Colfe's School, today an independent co-educational school located at Lee, near Lewisham, London. In addition the Company supports and maintains its longstanding connection with the Institute for Creative Leather Technologies (now a part of the University of Northampton), successor to the college which the Company founded at Bermondsey in 1909 as Leathersellers' Technical College. The Company continues to support higher education through exhibitions (grants) to university students, a practice which began in 1603 when four 'poor scholars', two at Oxford and two at Cambridge, were awarded five pounds and five shillings each per annum. Today around 100 students receive exhibitions which enable them to study at various universities.

== Military affiliations ==
The Leathersellers' Company is affiliated with the Royal Navy's submarine HMS Audacious, the 1st Queen's Dragoon Guards, 230 Squadron RAF, and most recently with Britannia Royal Naval College.

== Almshouses ==
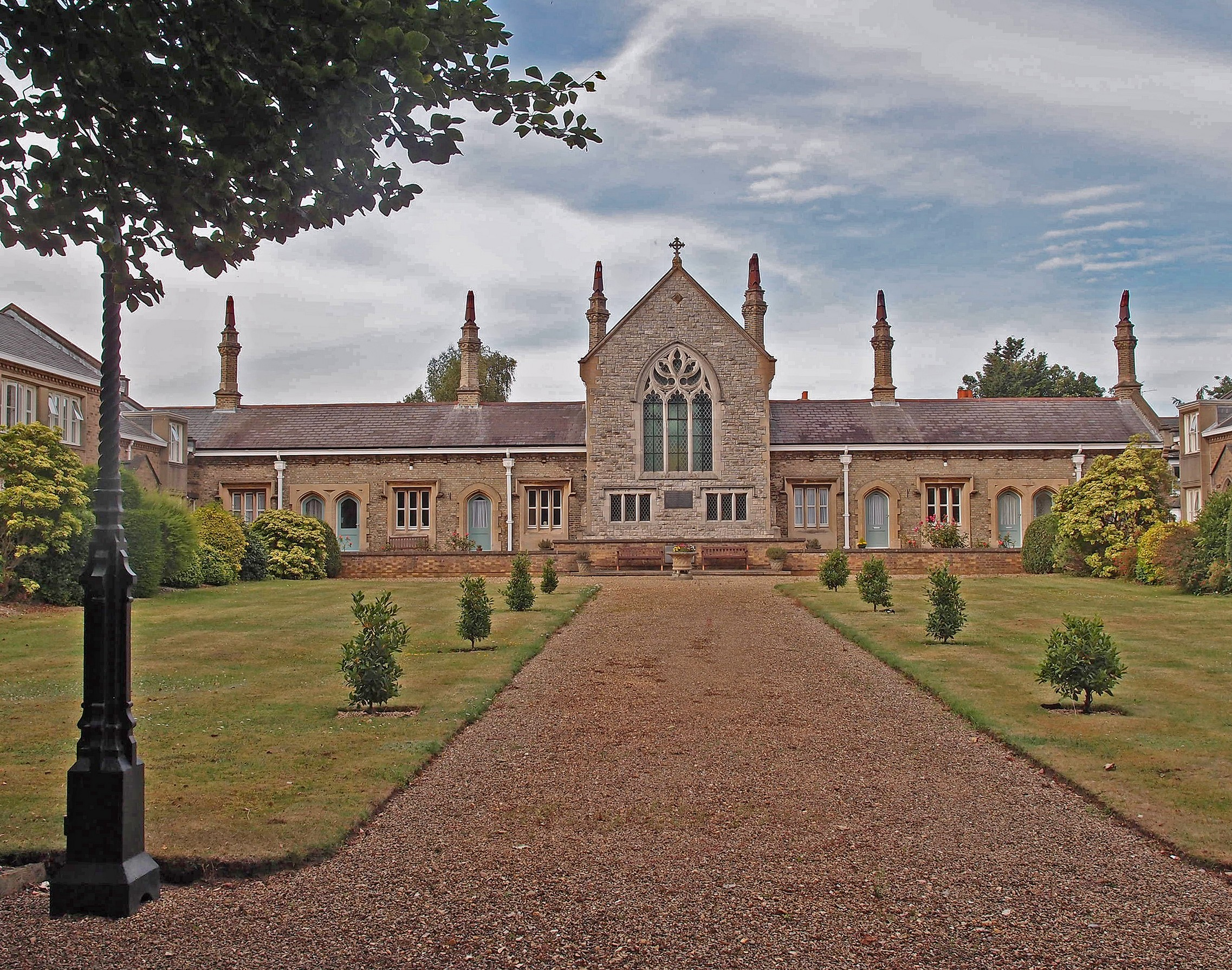
Leathersellers' Close almshouses, High Barnet

Like many other City livery companies, the Leathersellers have a long tradition of maintaining almshouses. The first almshouses run by the Company were built circa 1543-44, close to Leathersellers' Hall, on a site behind St Ethelburga's Church and housed seven elderly people. In 1837 the Company also built almshouses at Barnet in North London; these were extended in the mid-nineteenth century. In 1866 it was decided to close the almshouses in the City and remove the residents from there to join those already at Barnet. The Company continues to maintain almshouses at Leathersellers' Close in the London Borough of Barnet, home to about 20 residents and managed by Harrison Housing on behalf of the Leathersellers' Barnet Charity.

== Leathersellers' Hall ==
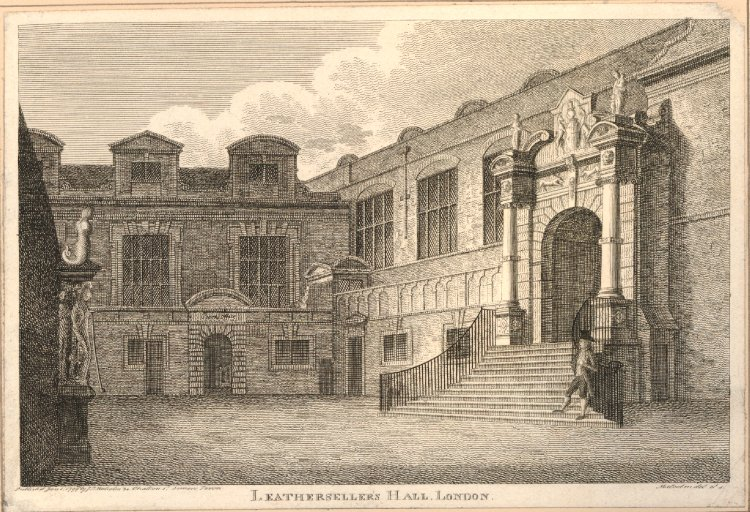
Engraving of the Leathersellers' Hall at St. Helen's Place, London, in 1799

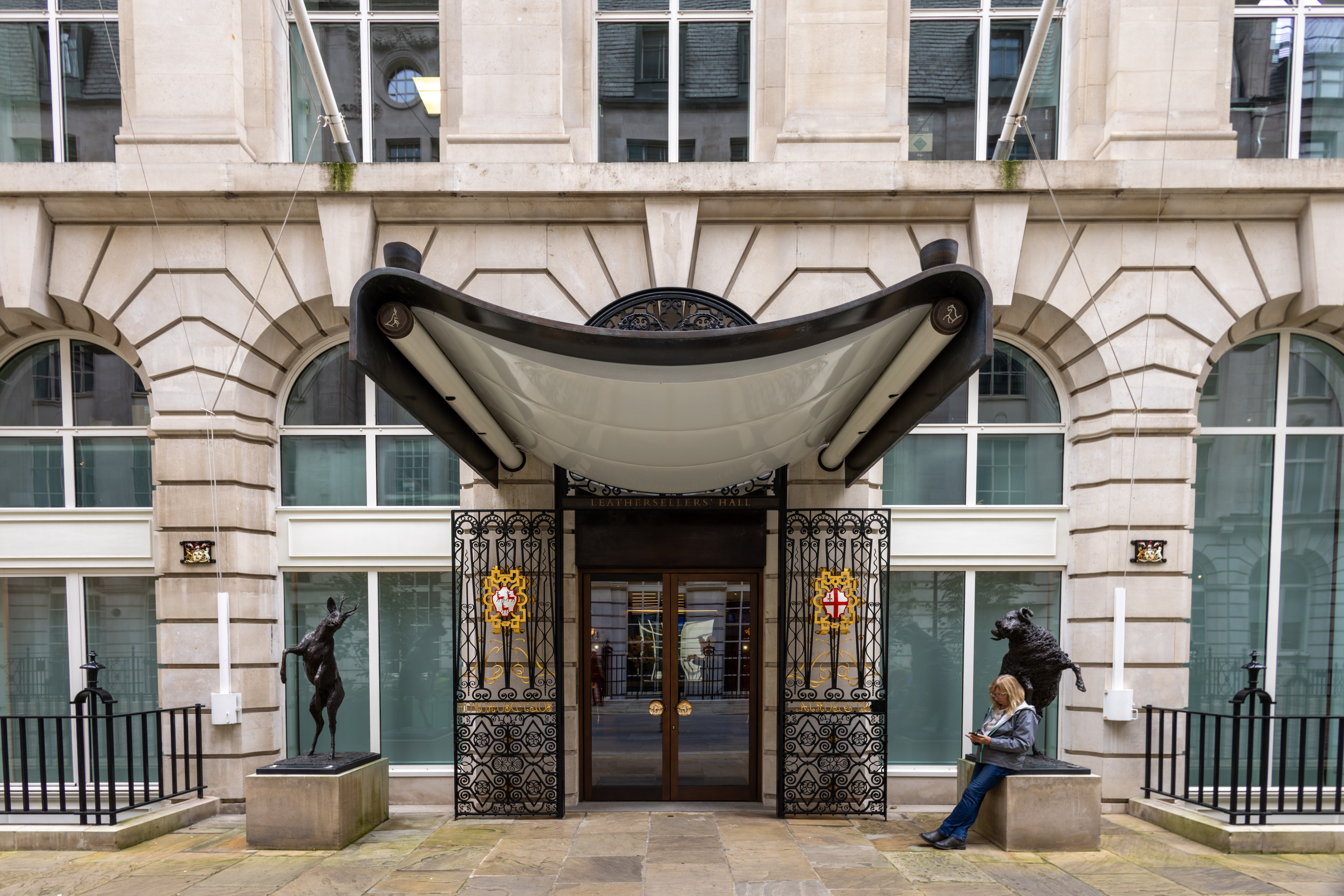
Entrance to the seventh and current hall

The Company had six previous halls throughout its history, and is now based at its seventh hall, which was officially opened by the Earl of Wessex in May 2017. Its first hall was on London Wall but in 1543 the Company acquired the former Benedictine convent of St Helen's, off Bishopsgate, and the subsequent halls have all been on that site, now St Helen's Place. The fifth hall was destroyed in May 1941 during the London Blitz. Its sixth hall officially opened in 1960 and was demolished in 2011, though the façade of the building has been saved. The new, seventh hall, has been designed by Eric Parry RA.

== See also ==
- Alderman Greg Jones
- City of London
