= Hilly Fields, Lewisham =

Park in London

Coordinates: 51.460°N 0.025°W

Hilly Fields
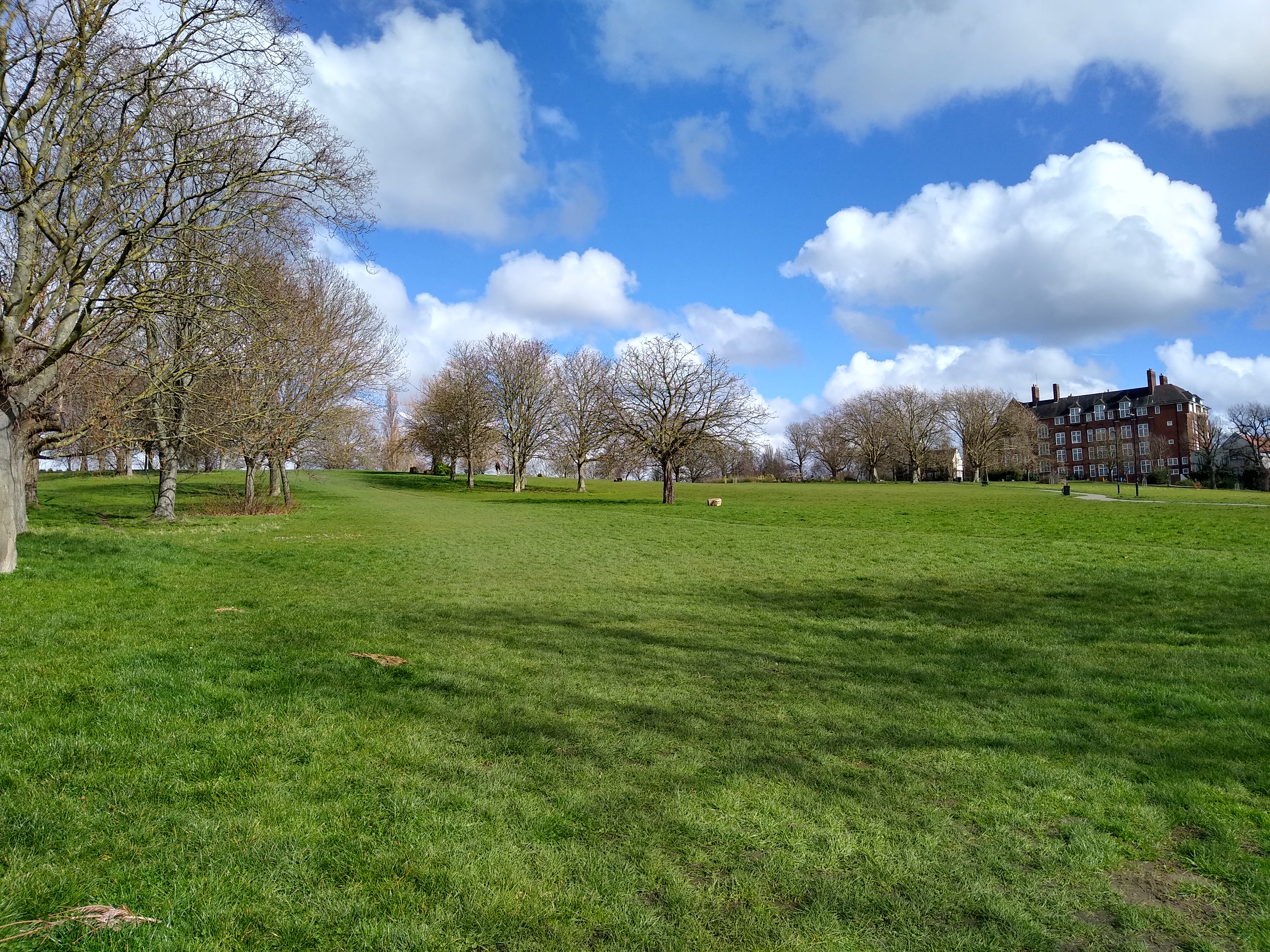
- Interactive map of Hilly Fields
- Type: Public park
- Location: Ladywell
- Elevation: 175 feet
- Opened: 1896; 130 years ago
- Owner: London Borough of Lewisham
- Public transit: 484

Hilly Fields is a public park located in Ladywell ward in Lewisham, South East London, and is managed by the London Borough of Lewisham. Preserved as a park through the efforts of Octavia Hill, it was opened in 1896.

== Origins ==
By the late 19th century, Deptford Common had been lost to developers. The philanthropist Octavia Hill was active in Deptford, and learnt of building proposals in the Hilly Fields area. Supported by the Commons Preservation Society, the Kyrle Society and the Metropolitan Public Gardens Association Hill formed a committee in 1889 to secure the preservation of the area as a public park.

Hill's committee succeeded in getting the London County Council (LCC) to open the park in 1896, the same year that the National Trust acquired its first property, Alfriston Clergy House; Hill was one of the three co-founders of the Trust. One of her co-founders, Robert Hunter, was the chairman of the committee to save Hilly Fields.

The park was laid out to a design by Lt Col J. J. Sexby, the Chief Officer of Parks for the LCC.

Responsibility for the park transferred from the LCC to the London Borough of Lewisham in 1971.

== Facilities and features ==
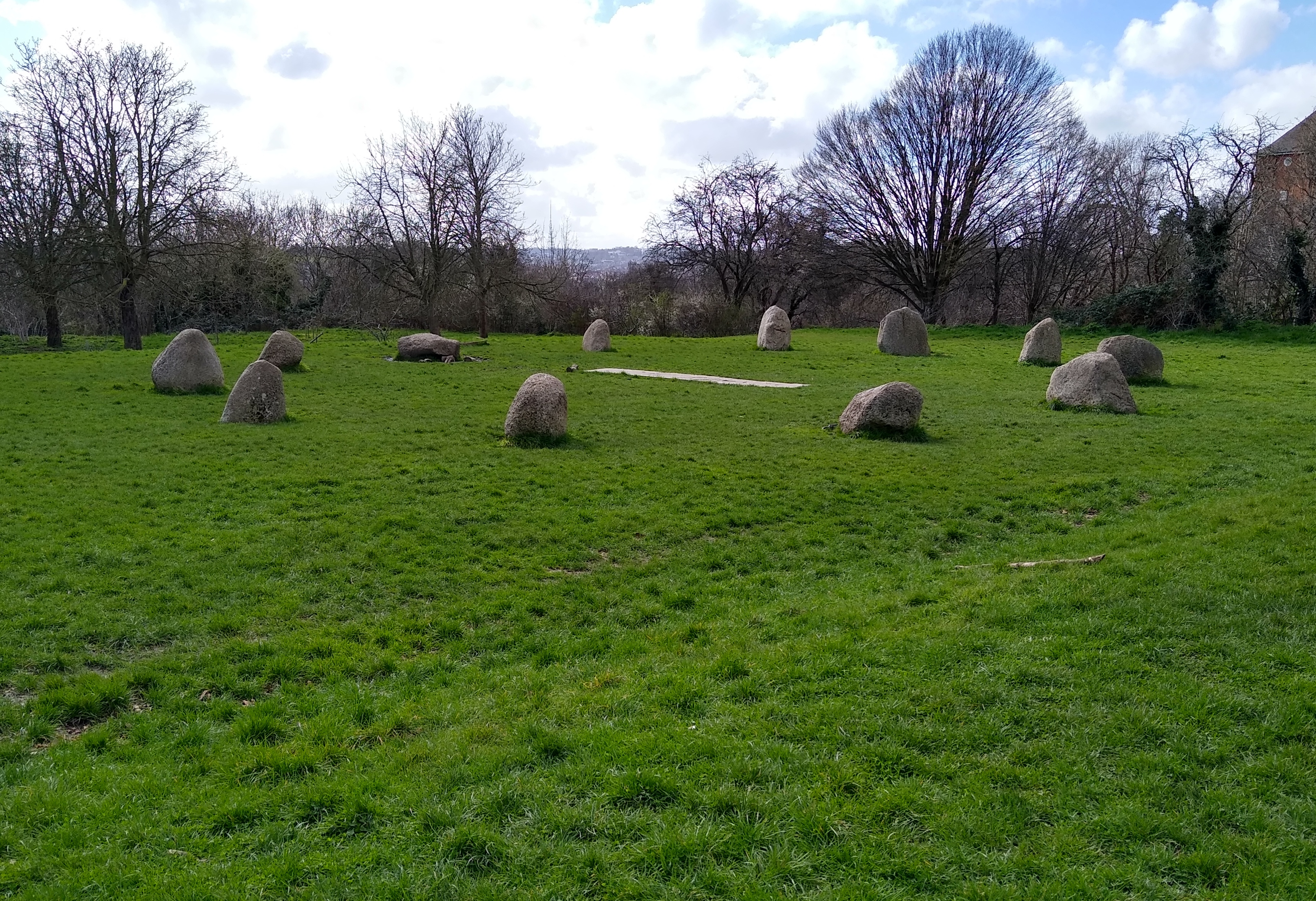
Stone circle

Within the park there are a number of facilities. The Francis Drake Bowls Club was opened in 1906. Other facilities include three tennis courts, a cricket pitch, a basketball court, a football pitch, a dog exercise area and a monthly farmers’ market.

For the Millennium in 2000, a stone circle was erected. The circle received a mention in the Civic Trust’s Awards in 2002.

A nature reserve was established in 1992.

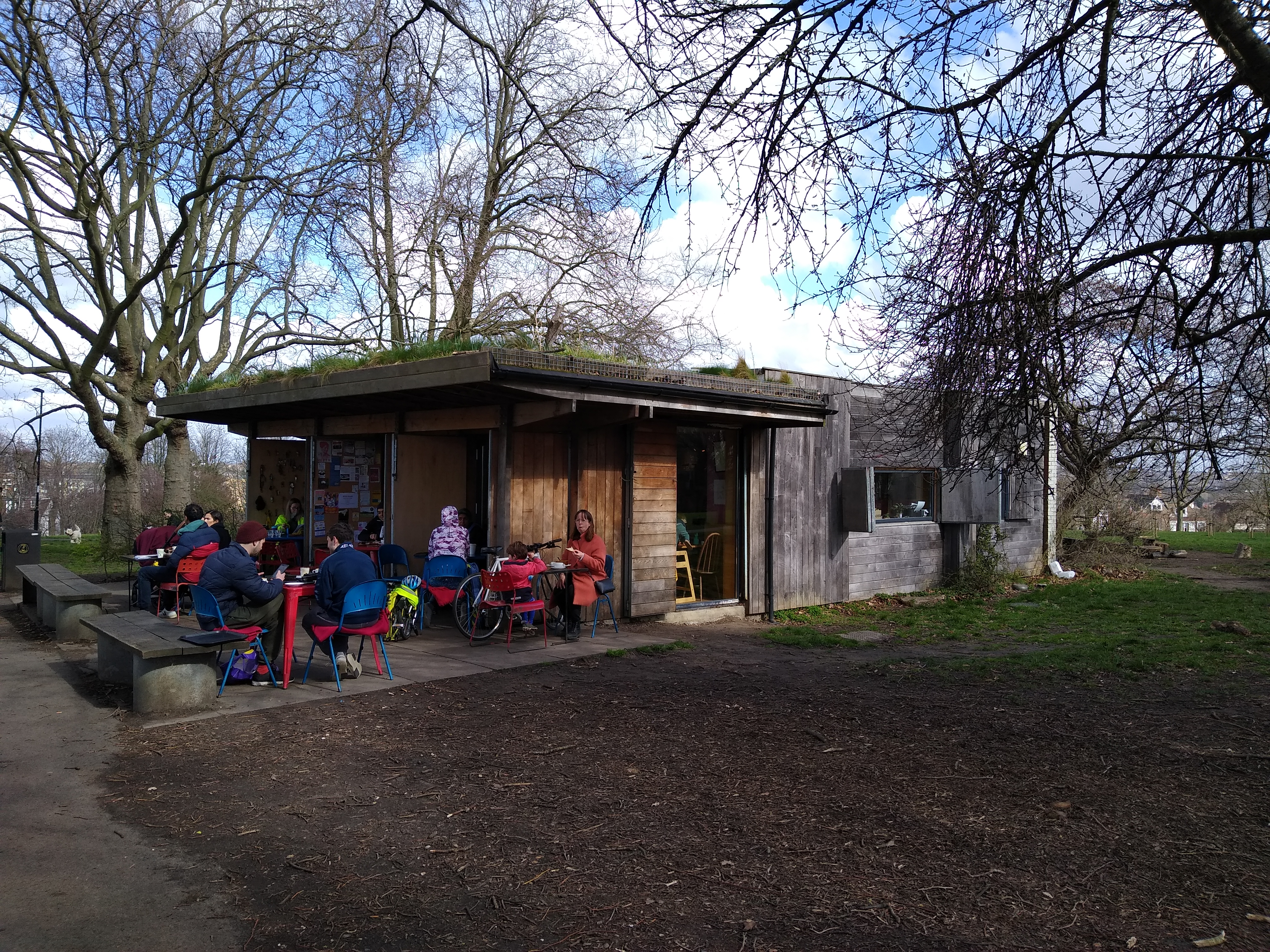
Pistachios in the Park

The park has a café, called Pistachios in the Park.

The park hosts a 5 km Parkrun on Saturday mornings and a 2 km Junior Parkrun on Sunday mornings.

One of the features of Sexby’s original design for the park was a bandstand. This was still in place in 1924. The Bandstand is now long-gone, but it is featured in a modern mural on the park café.

The summit of the park is 175 feet above sea level, from where views of central London can be obtained.

There is an active Friends Group.

Hilly Fields is within the Brockley Conservation Area, and has views of Blythe Hill Fields which can be seen to the south of the park.

== School ==
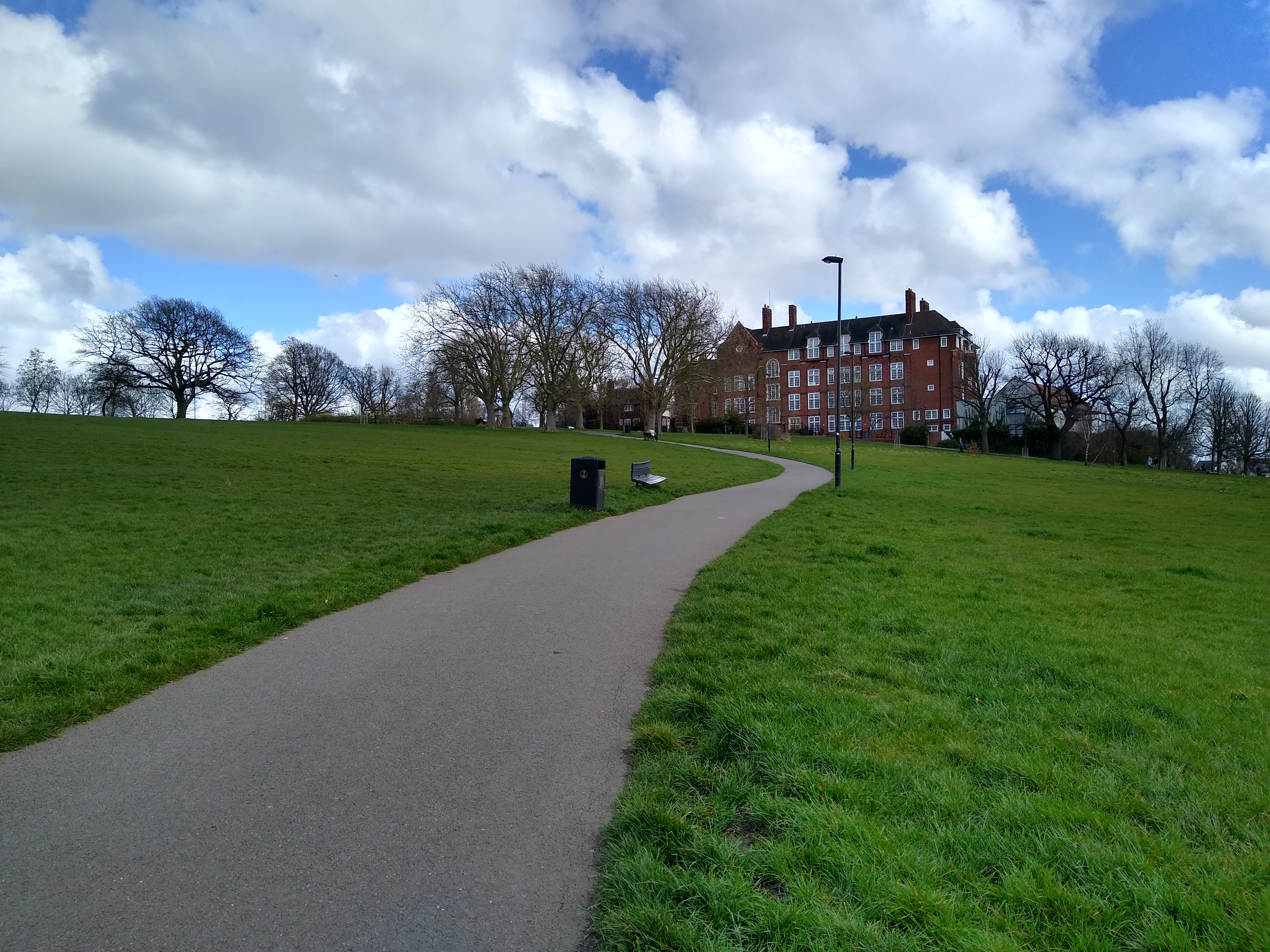
Prendergast School

In the centre of the park, and pre-dating it, is a secondary school. Built in 1884-5 as West Kent Grammar School, it later became Brockley County Secondary School. It is now Prendergast School. The school is listed (under its former name of Hillyfields Sixth Form Centre) Grade II* but only for the ‘exceptional’ mural paintings, executed between 1933 and 1936, in the school hall, by four painters connected with the Royal College of Art: Charles Mahoney, Evelyn Dunbar, Mildred Eldridge and Violet Martin.

== Cultural references ==
Edith Nesbit referred to Hilly Fields in her 1913 non-fiction work The Wings and the Child.

The Brockley-born novelist Henry Williamson referred to the campaign to save Hilly Fields in his 1952 novel Donkey Boy.

The poet David Jones used Hilly Fields as inspiration for his 1961 poem The Tutelar of the Place.

In 1982, musician Nick Nicely, who lived in Brockley at the time, released the single "Hilly Fields (1892)" inspired by the park.
