= Prendergast School =

Location
- Adelaide Avenue; Brockley, London, SE4 1LE; England; 51.459218°N 0.026024°W

Information
- Type: Academy Converter
- Motto: Truth and Honour, Freedom and Courtesy
- Established: 1890
- Founder: Joseph Prendergast
- Local authority: Lewisham
- Department for Education URN: 150319 Tables
- Ofsted: Reports
- Headteacher: Kelly Lovegrove
- Gender: Female (Mixed-sex sixth form)
- Age: 11 to 18
- Enrolment: 911 as of June 2022
- Website: Official website

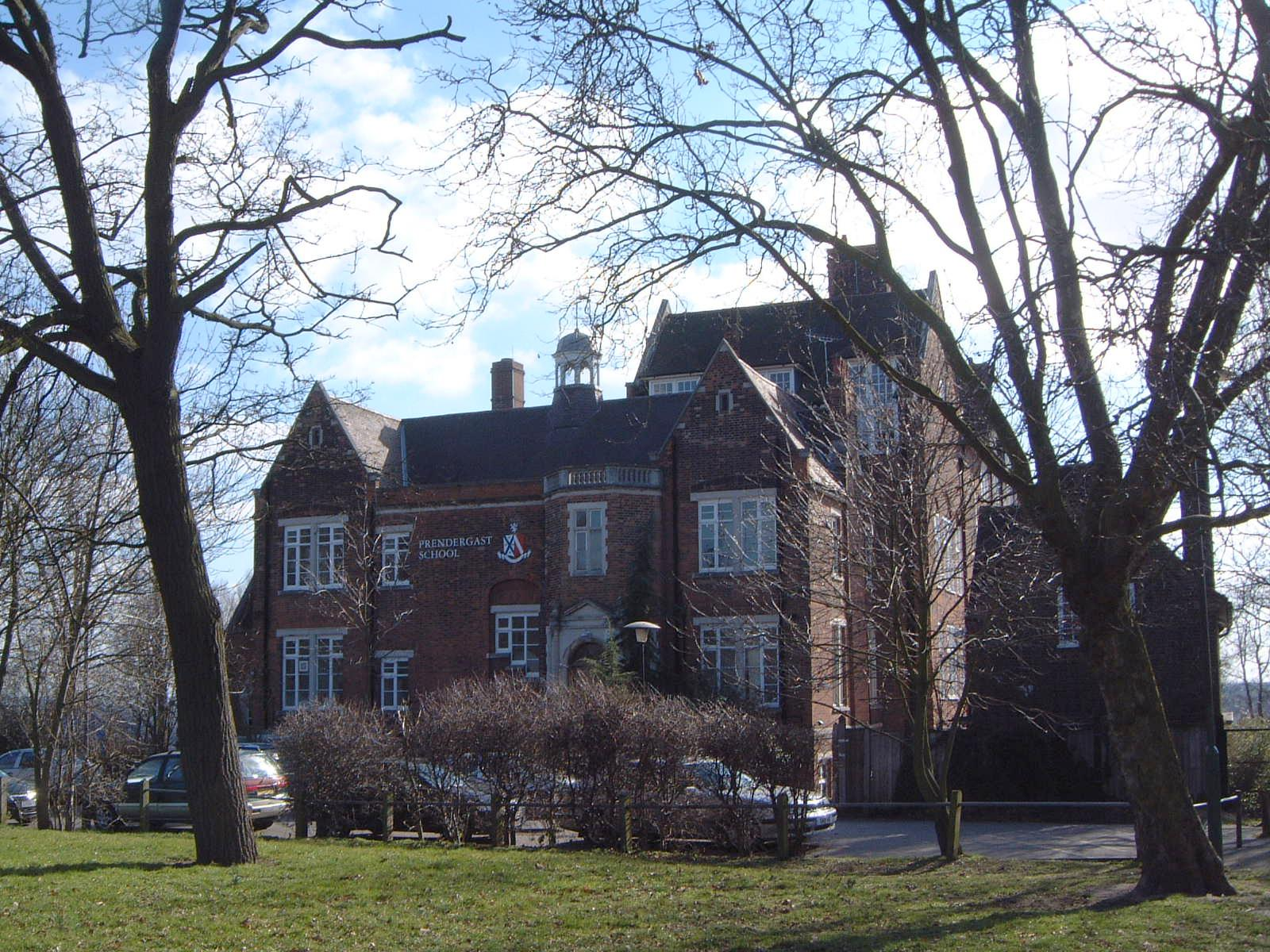
Prendergast School upper site

Prendergast School is a girls' secondary school and mixed-gender sixth form located on Hilly Fields, Brockley, in the London Borough of Lewisham. It is part of a multi-academy trust. The school motto is from Chaucer's Prologue to The Canterbury Tales: "Trouthe and Honour, Fredom and Curteisye". (In Middle English and in this context, "fredom" is generosity, not liberty.)

== History ==
Prendergast Grammar School was founded as a fee-paying grammar school in Rushey Green, Catford in 1890 under the will of the late Dr. Joseph Prendergast, DD (Cantab), 1791–1875, Headmaster of Colfe's School 1831–1857. His endowment was supplemented from several quarters, including some ancient charities associated with the parish of Lewisham.

In the first half of the 20th century the school accepted an increasing number of scholarship girls from LCC Elementary schools. Following the Education Act 1944, the school became a maintained grammar school with voluntary aided status.

In the 1970s, with the abolition of the grammar school system in the inner London area (i.e., under ILEA), the school became Comprehensive. In 1995, for reasons of space, the school moved to its present site following extensive refurbishment. The site had previously been occupied by the West Kent Grammar School, which closed in 1905 and the building was bought by the London County Council for the Brockley County Grammar School which opened in 1907. Prendergast had used the site for its Sixth Form Centre from 1983 to 1995.

== The School today ==
Prendergast School is an comprehensive academy-converter of about 1000 girls in the 11-18 age range (Year 7 to Year 13), including 180 in the sixth form (Year 12 and Year 13). Since the 2007/2008 academic school year, there has been a small intake of boys into the sixth form. In Year 7 it accepts applicants of all abilities and the admissions policy is largely based on proximity, but, as the school specialises in music, up to 10% of its intake can be determined by aptitude in this subject.

In recent years, official KS2-KS4 value-added indicators have consistently put the school in the top 10–15% of maintained schools. The Ofsted report of March 2003 noted, however, that attainment on entry to the school was higher than the national average. In the subsequent Ofsted report of March 2007, the school was awarded Grade 1 (outstanding) in overall effectiveness.

The school is linked with the Worshipful Company of Leathersellers, a City Livery Company, which gives occasional financial support, mainly for capital projects. It also awards three bursaries each year to leavers who are going on to university. Four members of the company are foundation governors. Although secular, the school also has historical links with the parish of Lewisham.

In 2008, there was a proposal, subject to consultation, to involve the school in a federation with Crofton School and a new 3-16 school in Lewisham. In September 2009, Prendergast School became Prendergast Hilly Fields College, having become part of a Federation with the Crofton School, now known as Prendergast Ladywell Fields College. Prendergast Vale College joined the federation in 2011. In 2015 all three dropped 'College' from their names and Prendergast also dropped 'Hilly Fields'. In 2015 an attempt was made to academise the school. The schools subsequently converted to academy status in January 2024.

== Site and buildings ==
The school is split over two sites spaced about one hundred metres apart. The upper site (originally the home of the West Kent Grammar School) was built in the 1880s and commands fine views over London, Kent and Surrey. It is a listed building of Grade II* status due to the presence of a series of high quality and rare mural paintings carried out in the Assembly Hall between the years 1933 and 1936 by four painters connected with the Royal College of Art: Evelyn Dunbar, Charles Mahoney, Mildred Eldridge and Violet Martin. These murals are considered some of the most important achievements of 20th century mural painting. The upper site also contains some stained glass panels, salvaged from the Catford site, and houses most of the classrooms and administrative offices. Adjacent to this, a new music block was neatly incorporated into the southern perimeter wall in 2005.

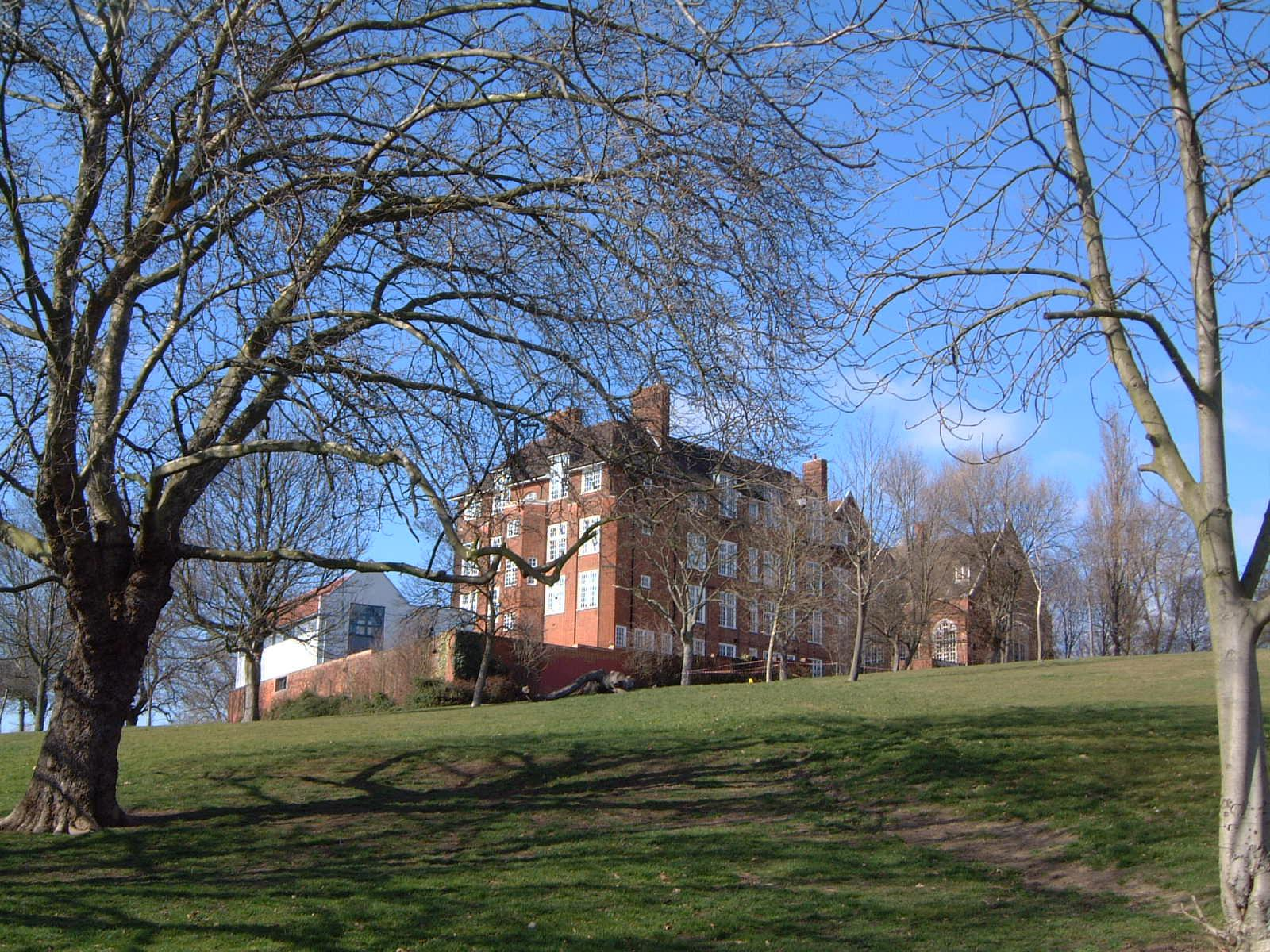

The lower site was comprehensively rebuilt apart from the sports hall in 2012-2013, while the upper site was extensively refurbished at the same time.

The sports ground is located in Bellingham, about 3 km to its south.

A relatively new addition to the school is the subject of Computer Science, which was introduced in 2018.

== Notable former pupils ==
- Tanith Lee, science fiction and fantasy writer
