= Trinity Church of England School =

Location
- Taunton Road; London Borough of Lewisham, Greater London; England
- Coordinates: 51°27′18″N 0°00′27″E

Information
- Type: Voluntary aided school
- Religious affiliation: Church of England
- Local authority: Lewisham
- Department for Education URN: 100749 Tables
- Ofsted: Reports
- Executive Headteacher: David Lucas
- Gender: Coeducational
- Age: 4 to 16
- Enrolment: 1,007 as of January 2023
- Website: trinitylewisham.org

Trinity Church of England School is a coeducational Church of England all-through school based over two sites in the London Borough of Lewisham, England.

Trinity is a voluntary aided school administered by the Anglican Diocese of Southwark and Lewisham London Borough Council. The Executive Headteacher of the school is Mr David Lucas.

The secondary phase of the school is located on Taunton Road in a building first opened in January 2011. The primary phase of the school is located on Ennersdale Road, and first opened to pupils in September 2013. The primary phase buildings were used between 2007 and 2011 as the temporary home for the secondary phase of the school while a new £16 Million pound building was built.
