= Haberdashers' Knights Academy =

Coordinates: 51.4279°N 0.0171°E

Haberdashers' Knights
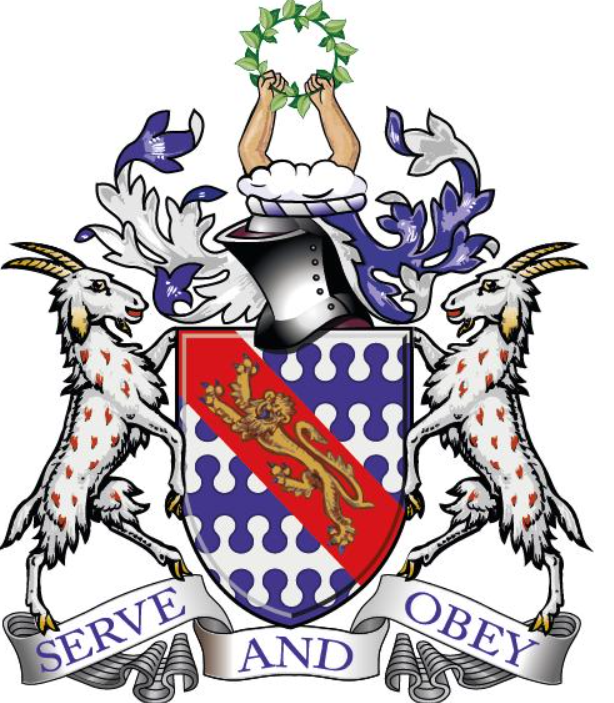
- Coat of arms of the Haberdashers' Company

Location
- Launcelot Road; Downham, BR1 5EB; England

Information
- Type: Academy
- Local authority: London Borough of Lewisham
- Department for Education URN: 135070 Tables
- Principal: Tesca Bennett
- Gender: Coeducational
- Age: 11 to 18
- Website: https://www.habsknights.org.uk/

Haberdashers' Knights Academy (formerly Malory School and then Haberdashers' Aske's Knights Academy) is a secondary school with academy status located in the Downham area of the London Borough of Lewisham, England. Haberdashers' Knights Academy is part of the Haberdashers' Aske's Federation in south-east London.
