= Bonus Pastor Catholic College =

Location
- Winlaton Road; Downham, London, BR1 5PZ; England
- Coordinates: 51°25′36″N 0°00′06″W

Information
- Type: Voluntary aided school
- Motto: Help, not hinder (Auxiliare Non Nocere)
- Religious affiliation: Roman Catholic
- Established: 1958
- Local authority: Lewisham
- Department for Education URN: 100752 Tables
- Ofsted: Reports
- Chair of Governors: P. Barber
- Principal: C. Mahon
- Gender: Mixed
- Age: 11 to 16
- Colours: Black, Grey, Gold and White
- Website: https://www.bonuspastor.co.uk

Bonus Pastor Catholic College is a voluntary aided, Roman Catholic coeducational school for 900 pupils in London. The school was founded by the Catholic Church in September 1958 to provide education for children of Catholic families.

== The College today ==
Bonus Pastor is based on two sites; Winlaton and Churchdown. The playing fields in Whitefoot Lane, adjacent to the school, are used for games and athletics. The college works very closely with the local primary schools and Christ the King Sixth Form College.

== Leadership of the College ==
Mr C Mahon effective from January 2025, has become the Principal of Bonus Pastor Catholic College.

== Rebuild of Bonus Pastor Catholic College ==
Bonus Pastor Catholic College is a five form entry secondary school occupying two separate sites; Winlaton and Churchdown campuses. The new buildings were occupied by the approximately 750 pupils in September 2012. The existing school was fully operational during construction works.
