= Conisborough College =

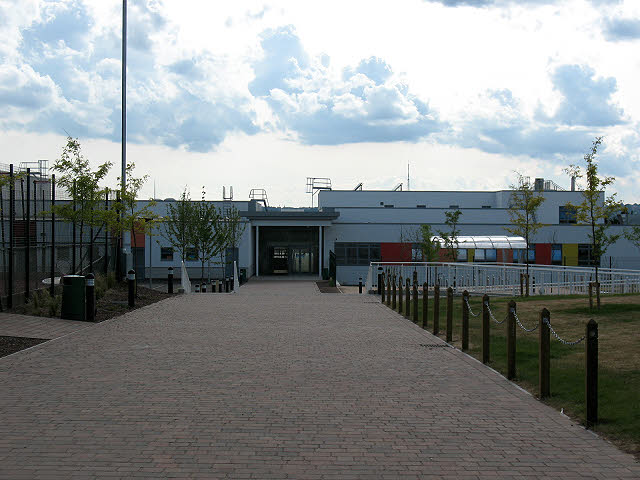
- Conisborough College

Location
- Conisborough Crescent; Catford, Greater London, SE6 2SE; England
- Coordinates: 51.43372°N 0.01053°W

Information
- Type: Community school
- Local authority: Lewisham
- Department for Education URN: 100742 Tables
- Ofsted: Reports
- Headteacher: Michael Harpham
- Gender: Coeducational
- Age: 11 to 16
- Enrolment: 850 as of December 2022
- Website: www.conisboroughcollege.co.uk

Conisborough College is a coeducational community secondary school, located between Catford and Downham, London in the London Borough of Lewisham, England.

The school offers GCSEs and BTECs as programmes of study for pupils.

Conisborough College has entered into a partnership with Colfe's School, a private school located in Horn Park. The partnership consists of projects and cross-curricular activities between the schools, and the highest achieving pupils from Conisborough are offered scholarships to the sixth form at Colfe's.

== History ==
Conisborough College was previously known as Catford County then Catford Girls School. One of its heads at that time, June Fisher was to become President of the National Union of Teachers. The school later admitted boys to Year 7 for the first time in September 2006, making it Catford High School. This change in name to Conisborough College coincided with the move to a new building and the final phase of the school becoming coeducational.
