= Prendergast Ladywell School =

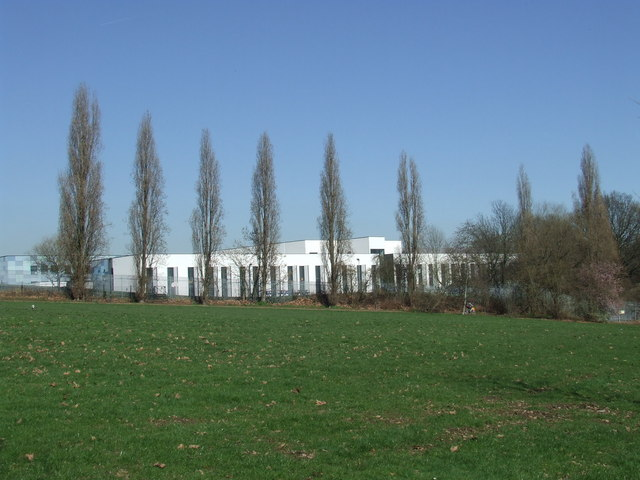
- Prendergast Ladywell School view from Ladywell Fields

Location
- Manwood Road; Crofton Park, Greater London, SE4 1SA; England; 51.45028°N 0.02743°W

Information
- Type: Academy school
- Motto: Achieving Excellence
- Local authority: Lewisham
- Department for Education URN: 100747 Tables
- Ofsted: Reports
- Executive headteacher: Paula Ledger
- Headteacher: Niall Hand
- Gender: Co-educational
- Age: 4 to 16
- Colours: Yellow, Deep Red
- Website: www.prendergast-ladywell.com

Prendergast Ladywell School is a co-educational all-through academy school located in the Crofton Park area of the London Borough of Lewisham, England.

Originally known as Crofton School, it was completely rebuilt between 2007 and 2008. In 2009 the school entered into the Worshipful Company of Leathersellers federation of schools, and was renamed Prendergast Ladywell Fields College. Other schools in the federation include Prendergast School and Prendergast Vale School.

Previously a secondary school, in 2014 a primary school provision was opened in separate buildings on the existing site. The combined all-through school was renamed Prendergast Ladywell School, which offers GCSEs and BTECs as programmes of study for pupils. The school also has a specialism in the Arts.

As of 1 January 2024 Prendergast School, Prendergast Vale and Prendergast Ladywell have officially become academies despite opposition from staff and parents.
