= Prendergast Vale School =

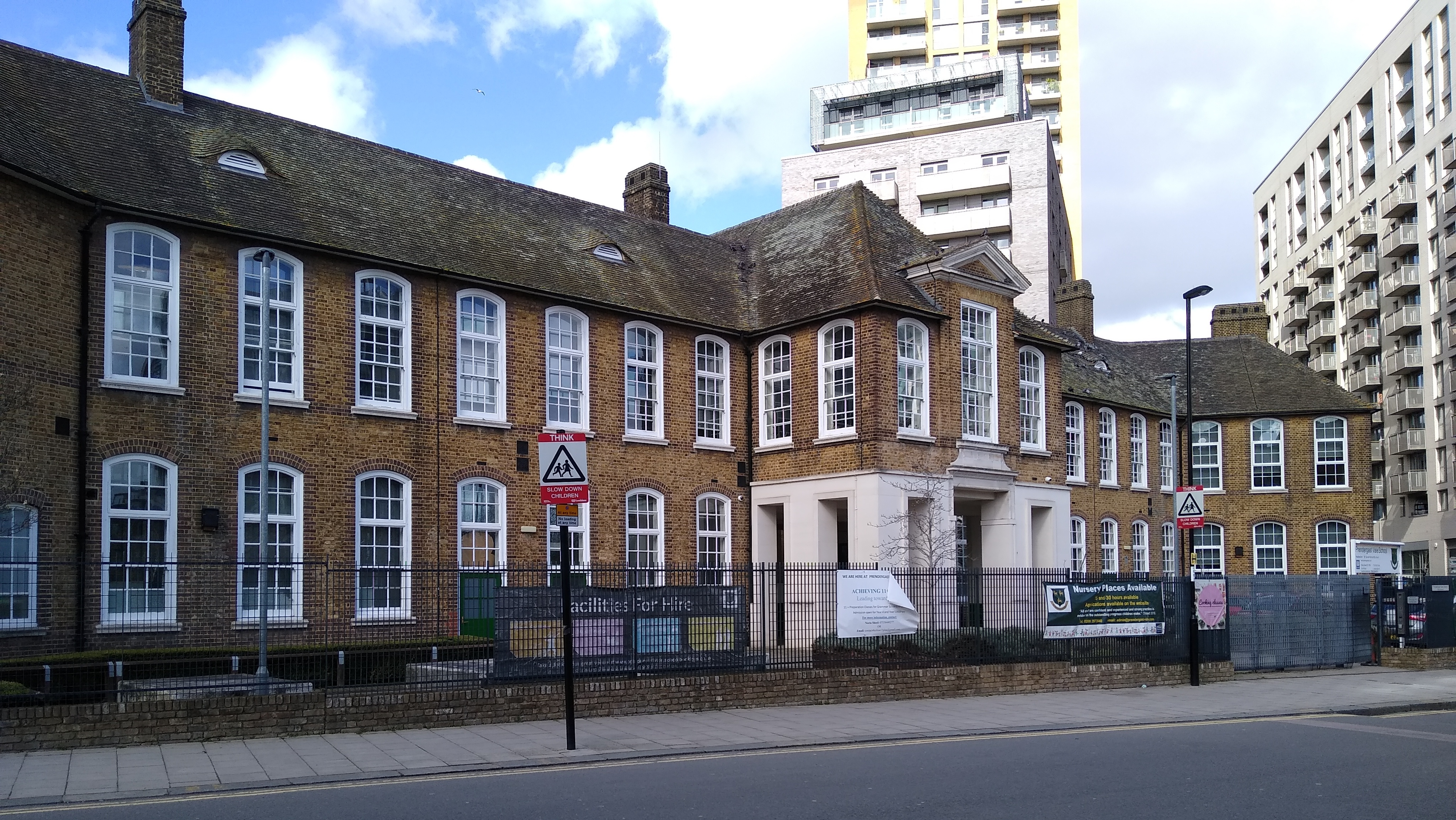

Location
- Elmira Street; Lewisham, Greater London, SE13 7BN; England
- Coordinates: 51.46362°N 0.01606°W

Information
- Type: Academy School
- Local authority: Lewisham
- Department for Education URN: 135843 Tables
- Ofsted: Reports
- Executive headteacher: Paula Ledger
- Headteacher: Edmund Coogan
- Gender: Mixed
- Age: 3 to 16
- Website: www.prendergast-vale.com

Prendergast Vale School is a co-educational all-through academy situated in the Lewisham area of the London Borough of Lewisham, England. The school provides continuous education for pupils aged 4 to 16, encompassing both primary and secondary years.

The institution was originally established as Lewisham Bridge Primary School, serving the local community as a primary-only setting. In response to growing demand for secondary school places in the borough, the school underwent significant redevelopment and expansion. In September 2011, it was rebranded as Prendergast Vale School following its transition to an all-through school, welcoming its first cohort of secondary-aged pupils that year.

Prendergast Vale School is part of a federation governed by the Worshipful Company of Leathersellers, a historic livery company with a long-standing involvement in education. This federation also includes Prendergast School and Prendergast Ladywell School.

As of 1 January 2024 Prendergast School, Prendergast Vale and Prendergast Ladywell have officially become academies despite opposition from staff and parents.

== Notable former pupils ==
=== Lewisham Bridge School ===
Lewisham Bridge School was founded in 1793 and shut down in 2011 to become an all through school now named Prendergast Vale School.

- Angie Le Mar, comedian and actor
