= James Nedeham =

James Nedeham or Nedham (died 1544) was an English architect who was Clerk of the King's Works for Henry VIII.

== Family background ==
His family had Derbyshire origins and his grandfather lived at Needham Grange at Hartington Middle Quarter. He was a relation of the Elizabethan merchant and prospector George Nedham.

== Royal works ==
He became a member of the London Carpenter's Company in 1514. First serving the royal works as a carpenter, Nedeham was appointed Clerk of the King's Works on 1 October 1532. He was a successor to the Master Carpenter Humphrey Coke, and he was employed as a military carpenter at Calais in 1522, and as a gunner the Tower of London in 1525.

He constructed galleries around the garden of the London house of the Marquess of Exeter in 1530. At Windsor Castle, he was involved in the construction of a new terrace on the north side. There were benches and Henry VIII used it as a range for his hand guns. The terrace was built on a series of brick vaults which also served to drain the water from the castle gutters. The framework of a timber arbour accessed from the terrace was painted by John Hethe with "white and fine bice and gold antique gilt".

At Greenwich Palace, Nedeham constructed kennels for the king's greyhounds at the tilt yard, a cockpit for fighting birds and seats for male spectators and for Catherine of Aragon, a shelter for the king to stand in to practice with hand guns,

Nedeham's account for Windsor includes refreshing the Queen's privy chamber for Anne Boleyn in June 1533. The ceiling had been decorated with mirrors, possibly for Philippa of Hainault, and 115 looking glasses were scoured at a cost of 9 shillings and 5 pence.

In 1534, Nedeham asked Thomas Cromwell for a larger budget for works at the Tower of London for a new gate and bridge and major repairs to the roof of the White Tower. In December 1534, he directed works at Greenwich Palace to make an artificial forest for the Lord of Misrule's boar hunt.

In April 1538, Nedeham was granted leases from various former monastic properties including lands from the convent of St Mary Wymondley in Hertfordshire, and made Wymondley Priory his home. Nedeham rebuilt the Jewel House at the Tower of London, and in November 1538, he and colleagues Henry Johnson and Anthony Anthony advised Christopher Morris, the Master of the King's Ordnance, on the building of storehouse and workshops for artillery at the Tower. An account book for 1539 mentions a timber "standing" at Egham meadows, probably erected for deer hunting.

He was included in the roll of New Year's Day gifts for 1540, receiving a silver gilt "cruse" or cup provided by the goldsmith Cornelis Hayes.

James Nedeham died in 1544 and was buried at Little Wymondley. The monument was later destroyed, but a drawing shows a classical structure polychromed as marble with pillars and an architrave surmounted by obelisks.

His own house in London in All Hallows Lombard Street parish was adjacent to an inn called the "White Hart of the Mystery or Art of the Fishmongers". He married Alice Goodere. His son John Nedeham was heir to his property.
