= Milton Chantry =

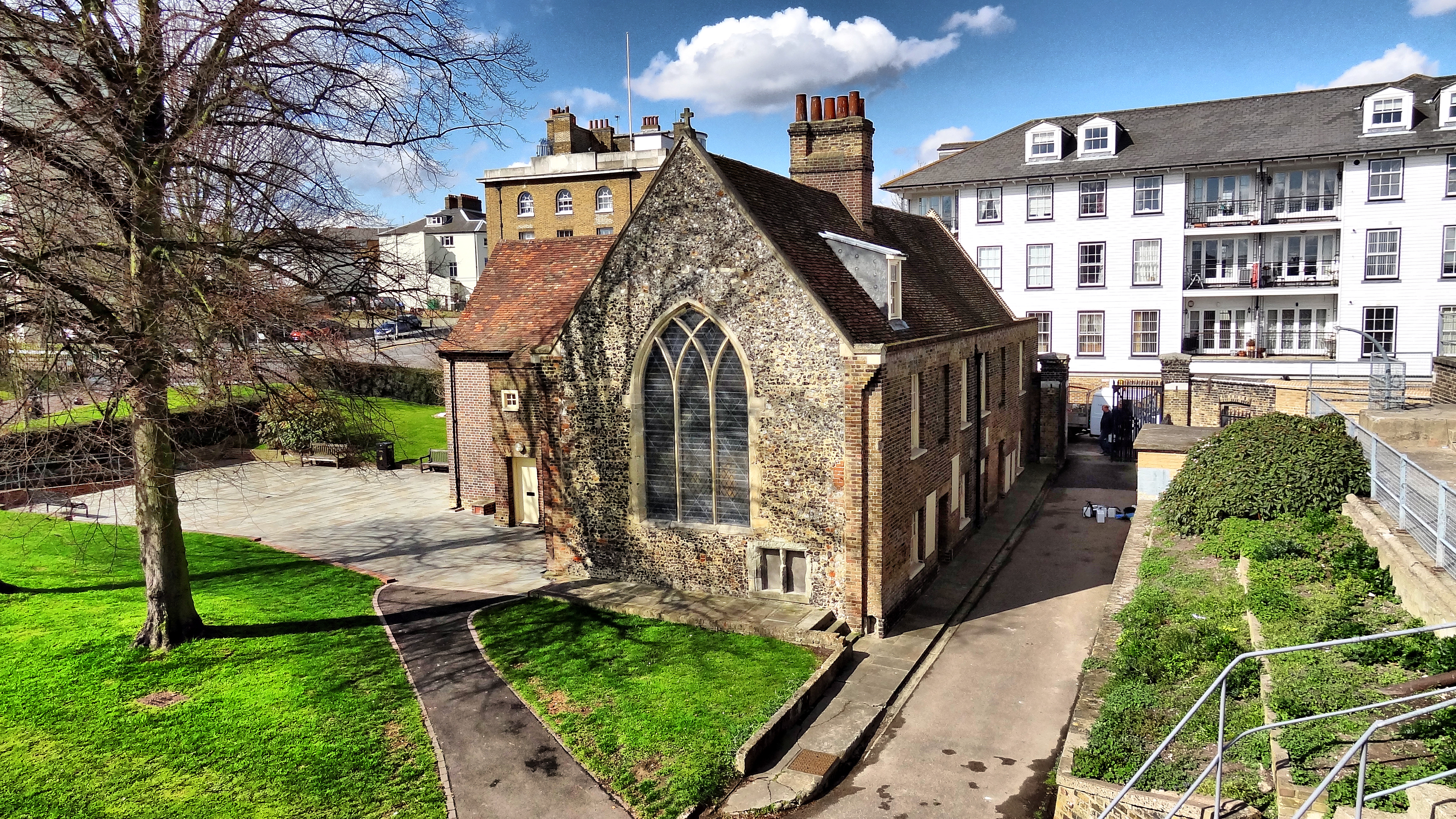
- Milton Chantry within New Tavern Park

- Milton Chantry location in Kent
- 51.4439°N 0.3765°E
- OS grid reference: TQ 6525 7434

History
- Founded: 1322
- Built for: Aymer de Valence

Listed Building
- Type: Grade II*
- Designated: 23 January 1952
- Reference no.: 1089047

Milton Chantry is a former chantry chapel in Gravesend, Kent, England. It houses the Chantry Heritage Centre, displaying a range of exhibits relating to Gravesend, Northfleet, and the nearby villages. It is within the Fort Gardens and is designated by English Heritage as a Grade II* listed building.

== History ==
Milton Chantry is the oldest building in the Borough of Gravesham, in the former parish of Milton. It was built in 1322 by Aymer de Valence the Earl of Pembroke as a chantry chapel. Milton Chantry is all that remains of the Hospital of St. Mary the Virgin leper hospital. The purpose of a chantry chapel was to say prayers for the souls of the dead. Many wealthy people built chantry chapels and gave them land to generate an income, in order to maintain a priest to pray for the owner and his family.

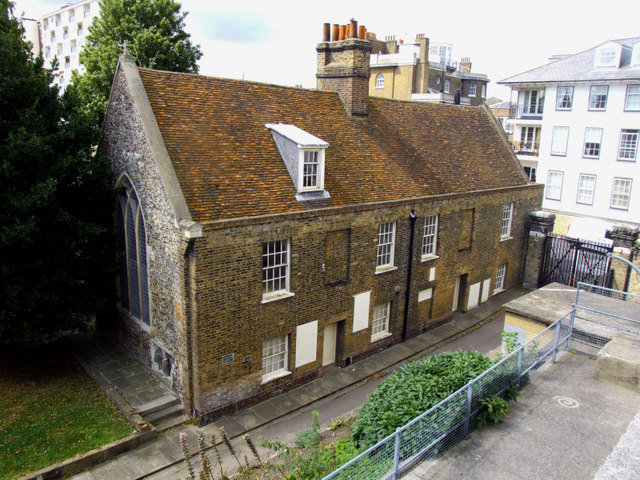
Milton Chantry

The Milton Chantry housed a number of priests appointed by the Bishop of Rochester until around 1524. It was then dissolved into Crown hands as part of Henry VIII's reformation of the churches. The building then became a family home (after a few alterations) and farm, but by the end of the 17th century it had become an inn and tavern named New Tavern.

Between 1780 and 1918, New Tavern Fort occupied the area around the chantry building. The tavern was converted into part of the fort's barracks. The New Tavern Fort was significantly altered between 1868 and 1871 under the direction of Charles George Gordon. The tavern and barracks were restored in 1852 and 1862.

In 1932, the fort was converted into a park for the residents of Gravesend. During the World War II, the basement of the chantry chapel was converted into a gas-decontamination chamber. Following the war, the chapel was converted into the local museum named the Chantry Heritage Centre. It is under the care of the Gravesend Local History Society.
