= Slough Fort =

- Allhallows-on-Sea, Kent, England
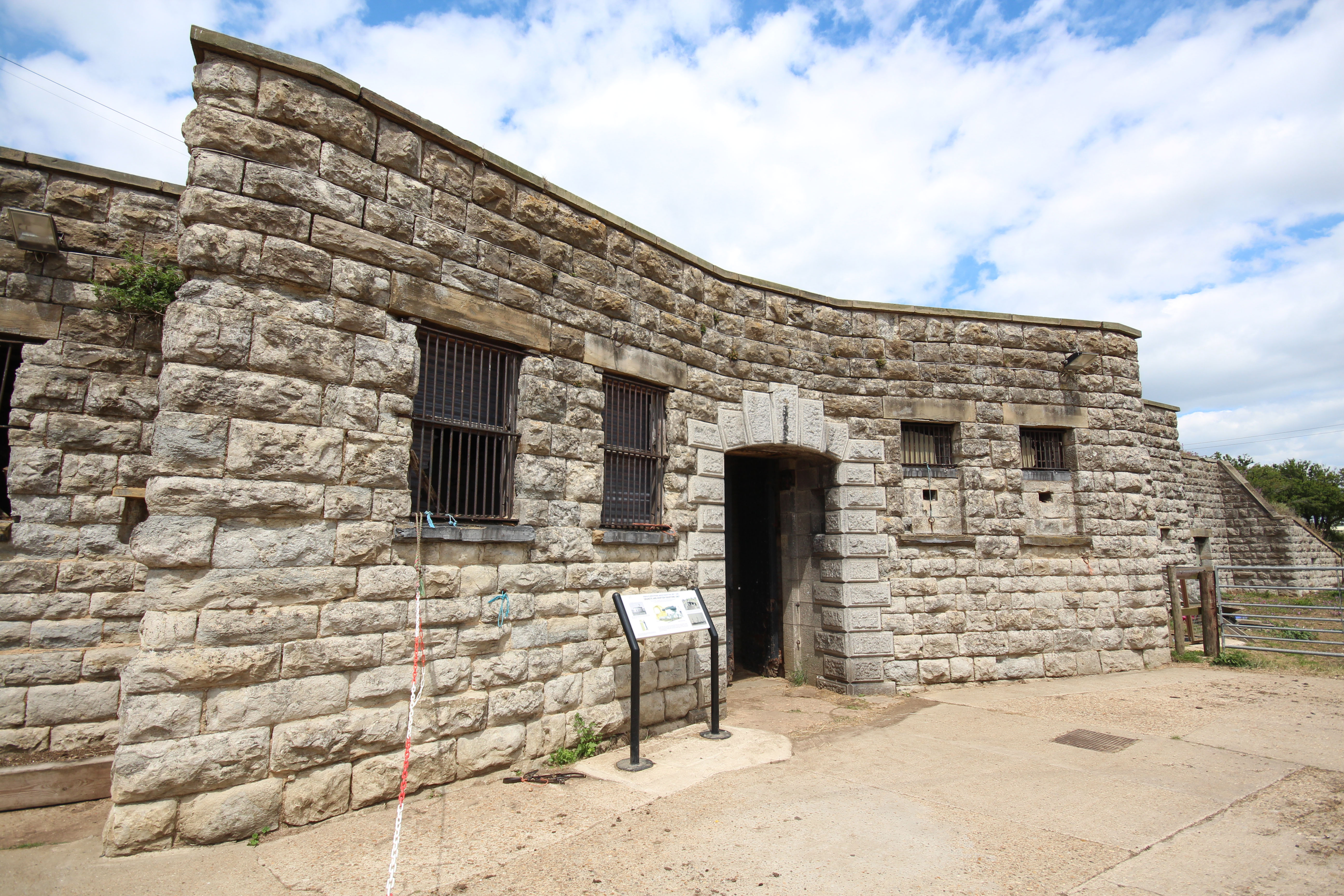
- Main entrance to Slough Fort

Site information
- Type: Fortification
- Owner: Private owners
- Condition: Mostly intact

Location
- Coordinates: 51.475737°N 0.644842°E

Site history
- Built: 1867
- Built by: United Kingdom
- In use: 1867–1929
- Materials: Concrete, granite, brick, Kentish ragstone

Slough Fort is a small artillery fort that was built at Allhallows-on-Sea in the north of the Hoo Peninsula in Kent. Constructed in 1867, the D-shaped fort was intended to guard a vulnerable stretch of the River Thames against possible enemy landings during a period of tension with France. Its seven casemates initially accommodated rifled breech loading guns, which were replaced by the turn of the century by more powerful breech-loaders on disappearing carriages, mounted in concrete wing batteries on either side of the fort. It was likely one of the smallest of the forts constructed as a result of the 1860s invasion scare.

All of the guns were removed by 1912, though the fort continued in use during the First World War as a command post. It was decommissioned in 1920 and sold off in 1929. Since the 1960s, it has been used as a stables adjoining a holiday camp. The camp's owners funded a partial restoration in 2012–13 that uncovered previously buried features of the fort.

== Strategic context ==
The fort was constructed in response to a naval arms race between Britain and France. Britain's coastal defences had not been substantially upgraded since the Napoleonic Wars, but a new generation of accurate and powerful guns, mounted on fast-moving, manoeuvrable iron-clad warships, had rendered obsolete the existing 18th and early 19th century forts along the British coastline. The Thames was seen as particularly vulnerable; as well as being one of the country's most important trade routes, it possessed several naval installations of great importance, including the victualling yards at Deptford, the armaments works of Woolwich Arsenal, the shipbuilding yards at North Woolwich, and the magazines at Purfleet.

The government's response to the increased threat was to appoint a Royal Commission on the Defence of the United Kingdom, which published a far-reaching report in 1860. It recommended that many existing forts should be upgraded or rebuilt entirely, and that new forts should be constructed to guard particularly strategic or vulnerable points along the coast. In all, around 70 forts and batteries were constructed around the English coast as a result of the Royal Commission's report. Slough Fort was probably one of the smallest of these.

== Construction ==
The position of Slough Fort (which took its name from the now-disappeared farmsteads of Upper and Lower Slough, just west of the fort) was dictated by its position on a ridge overlooking a slope leading down to the riverside. It was the only point along a fourteen-mile stretch of the river between Cliffe to the west and Grain to the east where a landing could be effected, due to the marshes along the rest of the shoreline. A fort situated at that point could thus provide an effective defence against an enemy attempting to land here. It also served to fill the gap between the upriver forts (Cliffe, Coalhouse and Shornemead) and those at the mouth of the Medway (Grain and Garrison Point). As an 1869 report noted, the fort was constructed "to prevent an enemy landing at the only accessible point for the purpose of attacking Chatham Dockyard from the north".

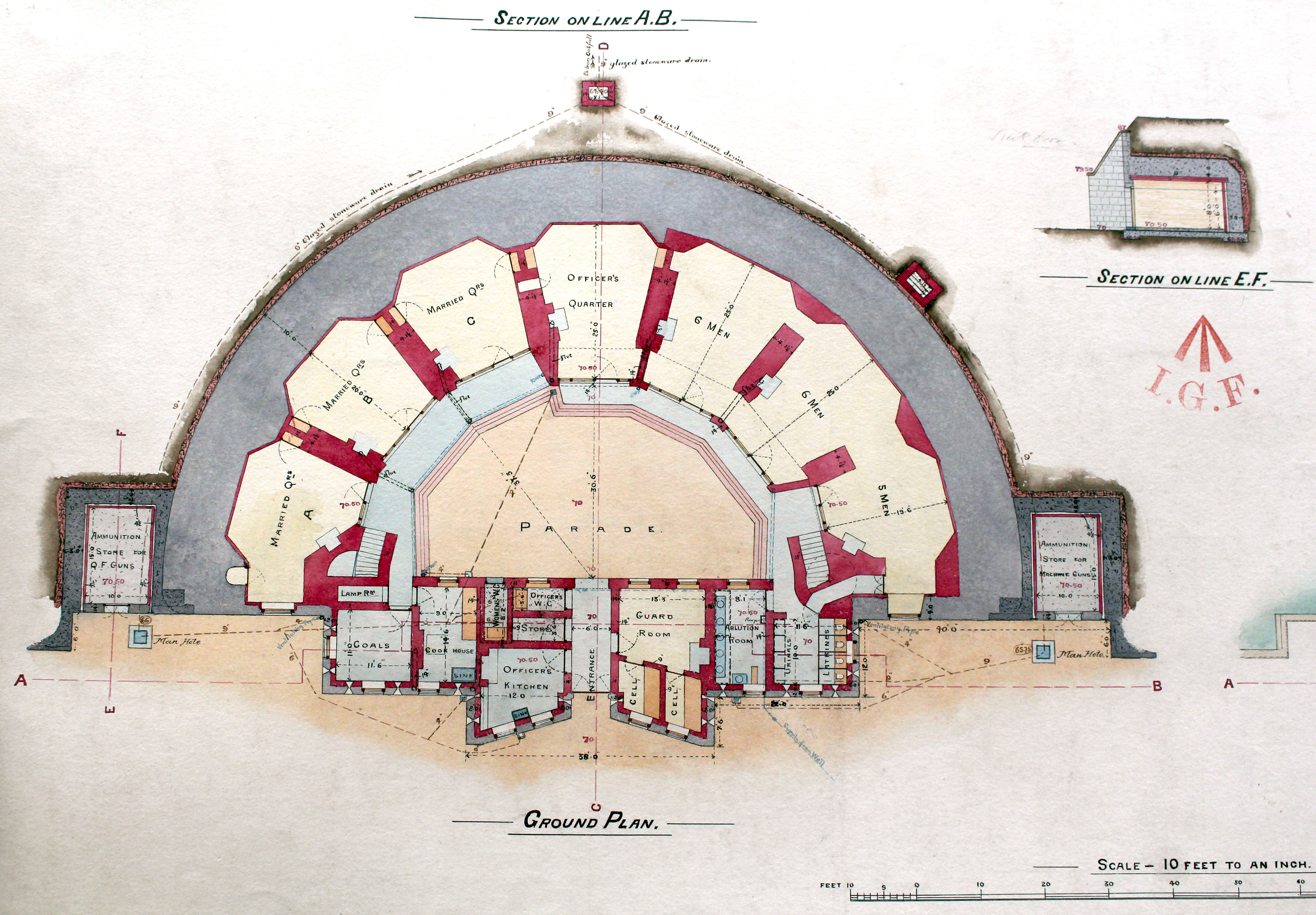
Ground plan of Slough Fort showing interior layout

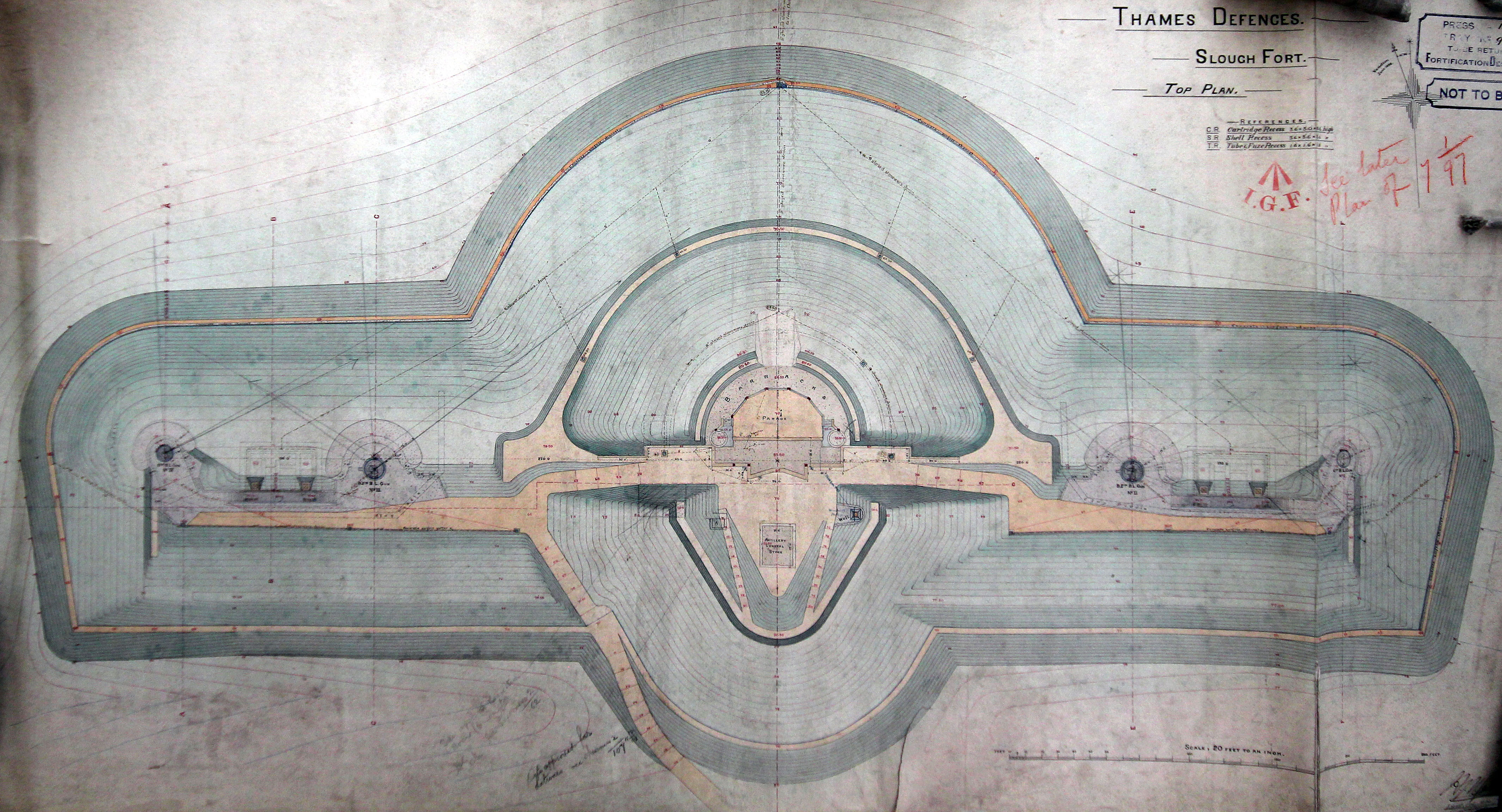
Top plan of Slough Fort showing layout of main fort (centre) and wing batteries

The land for the fort was bought by the War Office in 1861 for £1,639, but it was not built until 1867. The estimated cost of constructing the fort was reported in 1869 to be £27,343 (equivalent to £2,813,980 today). It took the form of a semicircular arc of seven casemates facing the river with a defensive ditch in front. Each casemate was faced in granite with magazines below providing ammunition via hoist shafts. A defensible block constructed of Kentish ragstone closed off the arc and provided the fort's domestic accommodation. The fort's main entrance is at the centre of the defensible block. A small stone-paved parade ground occupied the centre of the fort. After it was built, the ground behind the fort was raised and made into a glacis. On the roof of the fort, accessed from the ground level by two spiral staircases, there was an observation post protected by a banquette (an elevated step to facilitate rifle fire against attackers at close range).

== Operational history ==
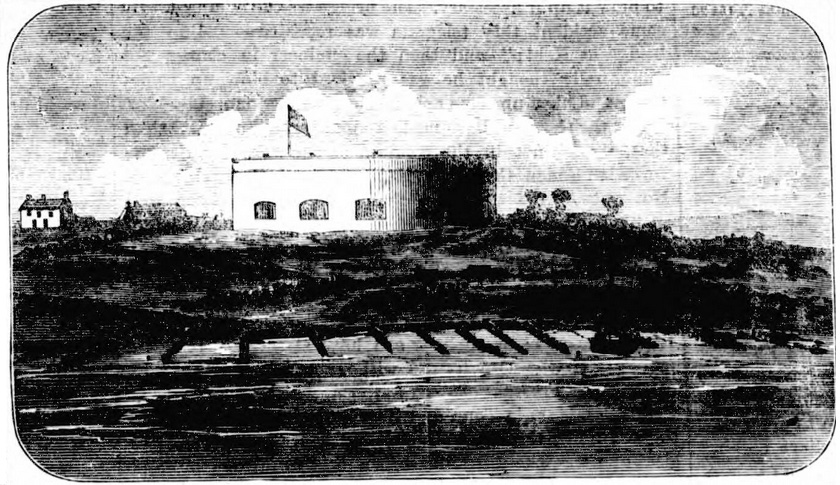
Slough Fort in an 1870 engraving

Slough Fort was initially armed with seven 7-inch rifled breech loaders (RBLs) positioned in the casemates. It was manned by three officers, one NCO and 75 other ranks. Between October 1889 and December 1891, a pair of wing batteries were constructed from concrete on either side of the fort, with a range finder position being added to the fort's roof. The new batteries accommodated two 9.2-inch and two 6-inch breech loaders on disappearing mountings, allowing them to recess below ground level once they had fired. These were much more powerful and longer ranged weapons than the old RBLs and were capable of engaging a battleship at a substantial distance. The old RBLs were removed.

The structure of the fort underwent substantial changes around this time. The casemates, which were now vulnerable to the more powerful artillery that had been developed since they were built, were covered almost up to roof level by an earthen glacis. Their interiors were also partly infilled with rubble, as was the defensive ditch in front of the casemates, providing additional protection against enemy fire as it helped to camouflage the structure. Two light quick-firing guns with ammunition lockers were installed on the fort's roof to guard against small, fast-moving threats such as torpedo boats. The rest of the fort remained intact but was now used as a barracks for the wing batteries. Three of the truncated casemates were converted into married quarters, one became officers' quarters and the final three were used by the men. An additional set of detached quarters for a Warrant Officer and a small detachment of Royal Engineers was constructed to the south-east of the fort, along with barrack stores.

Two new 9.2-inch guns were installed in 1906 in the western wing battery. They were mounted on barbettes, enabling them to recoil along their axis and so delivering a much faster rate of fire. One 9.2-inch and one 6-inch gun on a disappearing mounting remained in the eastern wing battery before being removed in 1907. During the war the fort was used as a Battery Command Post operating in conjunction with a Port War Signal Station located to the fort's east, which was responsible for monitoring all shipping entering or leaving the Thames. The remaining two 9.2-inch guns were removed in 1917 and reinstalled at Fletcher Battery, a newly built position on the Isle of Sheppey.

The Army discontinued the use of the fort in 1920 and in 1929 it was sold off and converted into a small zoo. It saw one further period of military usage during and immediately before the Second World War; it was used as an observation post from 1938, became part of the local anti-invasion system in 1939–40 and was used as part of the air defence network against V-1 flying bombs in 1944. After the war it belonged to the Allhallows Estate Company before passing to Strood Rural District Council. Plans were advanced to demolish it but the cost proved prohibitive. It was instead converted into a riding stables in the early 1960s.

== Current status ==
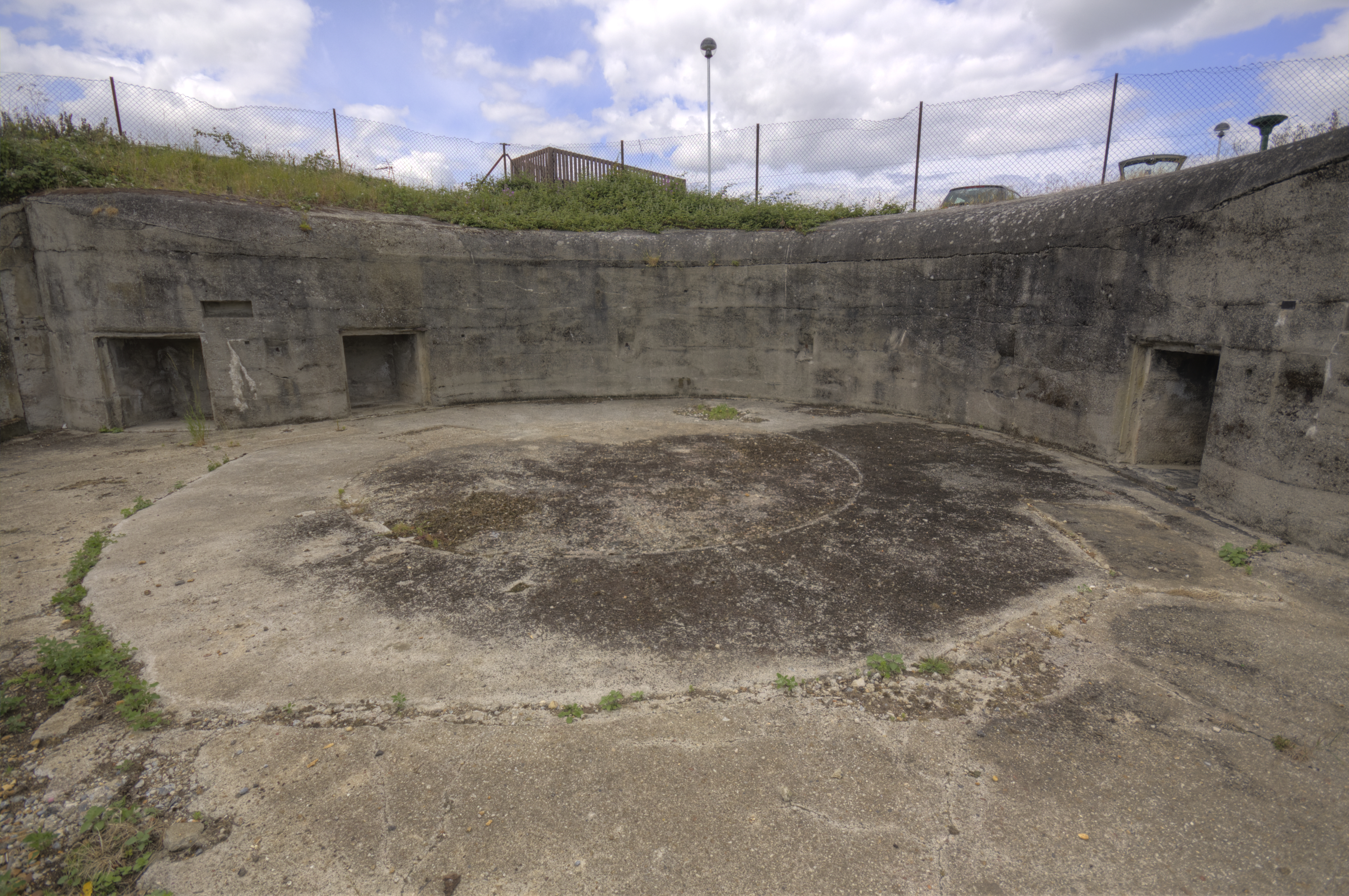
Gun position 3 in the left wing battery, which originally accommodated a 9.2-inch gun

Slough Fort is well-preserved and still substantially intact, though it has suffered some damage over the years (notably the loss of the outermost gun position of the left wing battery) and is surrounded on three sides by the caravans of the Allhallows Leisure Park. English Heritage designated it as a Grade II* listed building in 2009 in recognition of its unusually good state of preservation and for the way that it embodies "both technological developments in armaments and coastal defence during the late-C19 to early-C20 as well as the changing views of the perceived defensive need on the north Kent coast at this time." The wing batteries have been listed separately, also since 2009, as a scheduled monument in recognition of their rarity.

The fort is currently privately owned and continues to be used as a stables; the casemates are used as stalls for the horses. The main body of the fort is not accessible to the public, but Bourne Leisure, the owners of the adjoining Allhallows Leisure Park, have funded a partial restoration. The wing batteries have been cleared of thousands of tons of accumulated debris, a walking trail linking them has been laid out and interpretative signs have been installed for the benefit of visitors to show how the fort once appeared and how it functioned when it was in use. The Slough Fort Preservation Trust is working to repair the fort and increase public access.
