= Coalhouse Fort =

Artillery fort at Coalhouse Point in Essex, England

- East Tilbury, Essex, England
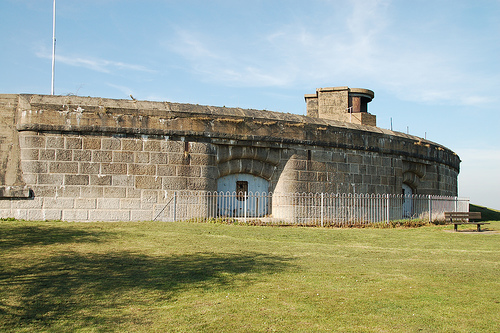
- Exterior of Coalhouse Fort

Site information
- Type: Fortification
- Owner: Thurrock Council
- Controlled by: Coalhouse Fort Project
- Condition: Intact

Location
- Coordinates: 51°27′54″N 00°25′58″E

Site history
- Built: 1861–74
- Built by: United Kingdom
- In use: 1874–1949
- Materials: Concrete, granite, cast iron, brick, Kentish ragstone

Coalhouse Fort is an artillery fort in the eastern English county of Essex. It was built in the 1860s to guard the lower Thames from seaborne attack. It stands at Coalhouse Point on the north bank of the river, at a location near East Tilbury which was vulnerable to raiders and invaders. It was the last in a series of fortifications dating back to the 15th century and was the direct successor to a smaller mid-19th century fort built on the same site. Constructed during a period of tension with France, its location on marshy ground caused problems from the start and led to a lengthy construction process. The fort was equipped with a variety of large-calibre artillery guns and the most modern defensive facilities of the time, including shell-proof casemates protected by granite facing and cast-iron shields. Its lengthy construction and the rapid pace of artillery development at the time meant that it was practically obsolete for its original purpose within a few years of its completion.

The fort's armament was revised several times during its 70 years of military use, as its role evolved in the river's defensive system. It was initially a front-line fortification, supported by Shornemead Fort and Cliffe Fort located to the south and east respectively on the Kent shore. Over time, as batteries and forts further downriver became the front line of the Thames defences, Coalhouse Fort was stripped of its main weapons and it was altered to support smaller quick-firing guns intended to be used against fast-moving surface and aerial targets. Its last military use was as a training facility for a few years after the Second World War.

Decommissioned in 1949, the fort was used as a storehouse for a shoe factory before it was purchased by the local council. The surrounding land was developed into a public park, but the fort itself fell into dereliction despite its historical and architectural significance. From 1985 it was leased to a voluntary preservation group, the Coalhouse Fort Project, which had been working to restore the fort and use it for heritage and educational purposes. Funding for its restoration was provided in part by the Heritage Lottery Fund and the Warner Bros. film studio, which used the fort as a location for the opening scenes of the 2005 film Batman Begins. The group closed in 2020.

== Development ==
=== Early defences ===
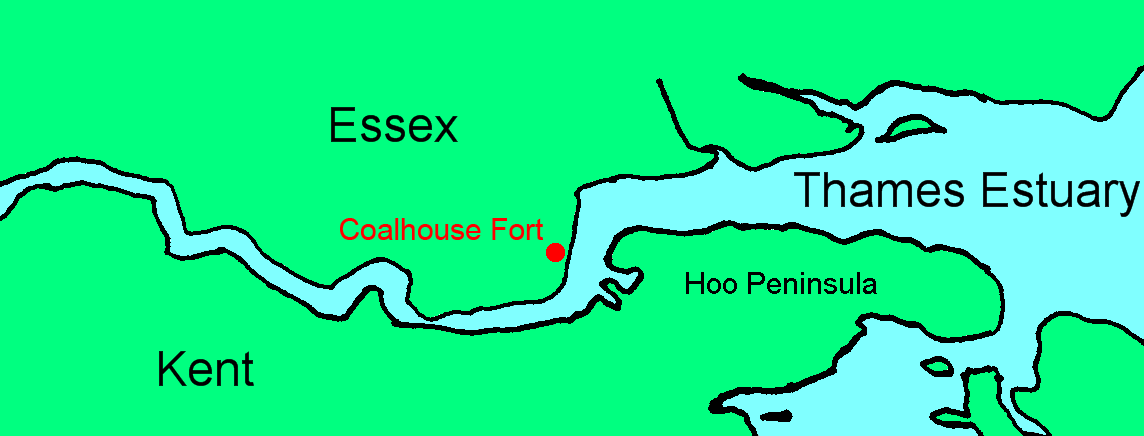
Location of Coalhouse Fort in the Lower Thames

East Tilbury, which stands at the western end of the section of the Thames known as Lower Hope Reach, was fortified long before the building of Coalhouse Fort due to its vulnerability to seaborne attackers. Settlements on both sides of the Thames were raided by the French in 1379 during the second phase of the Hundred Years' War. The attack prompted the building of Cooling Castle on Kent's Hoo Peninsula between 1380 and 1385 but there was initially no corresponding move to improve the defences of East Tilbury.

Appeals from the local people led to the Crown agreeing in July 1402 to build an earthen rampart and towers to protect the settlement. The site of these early defences is not known but might have been near where St Catherine's Church now stands. A ditch of unknown date in that vicinity may represent a fragment of the medieval defences.

=== Henrician defences ===
Henry VIII ordered the construction of an artillery blockhouse at East Tilbury in 1539–40 as part of a major scheme to fortify the coastline of England and Wales. It followed his break from the Pope and the Catholic Church, which led to fears that the Catholic powers of Europe would seek to invade so as to reimpose Papal authority. Five blockhouses were built along the Thames between Gravesend and Higham – two on the north bank at Tilbury and East Tilbury and three on the south bank at Gravesend, Milton (near the present New Tavern Fort) and Higham.

The East Tilbury Blockhouse was built partly with stone taken from St Margaret's Chapel in Tilbury, which was dissolved in 1536. Its form is not known but it probably consisted of a brick and stone structure, perhaps in a D-shape, with a rampart and ditch to enclose its landward side. It was recorded as having fifteen iron and brass cannon of various calibres in 1540; these had been increased to 27 by 1539–40. It had a small permanent garrison, consisting of a commander and his deputy, a porter, two soldiers and four gunners. The blockhouse may have been altered in 1545 but in 1553 it was disarmed. Although the corresponding blockhouse at Gravesend continued in use and that at Tilbury was eventually incorporated into Tilbury Fort between 1670 and 1683, the one at East Tilbury seems to have been abandoned before the end of the 16th century. By 1735 it had been inundated by the river and was in ruins. Its site by the shoreline has since been eroded away by tidal action, though it is possible that remains from the blockhouse may still survive under the river mud.

=== Coalhouse Battery ===
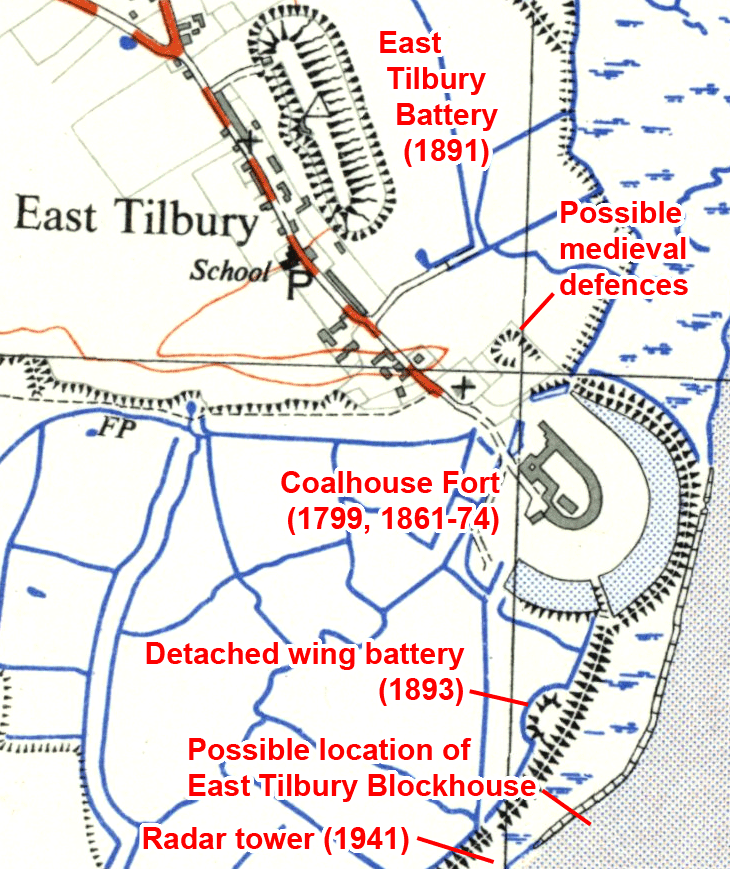
Annotated map of the defences around East Tilbury as they were in 1958

The June 1667 Raid on the Medway by the Dutch fleet during the Second Anglo-Dutch War exposed the weaknesses of the Thames defences. It took another hundred years for the defences on Gravesend Reach to be improved, in the form of new works at Gravesend and Tilbury built in the 1780s, but even then the potential of forward defence – to prevent enemies accessing the lower Thames – continued to be neglected. It was not until the outbreak of the French Revolutionary Wars that the need for effective forward defence was addressed. Lieutenant Colonel Hartcup of the Royal Engineers carried out a survey of the Thames in 1794 in which he recommended building a triangle of artillery batteries to guard the entrance to Gravesend Reach and the next reach of the river, Lower Hope Reach. Two of the batteries would be located on the south bank at Shornemead, about 1.5 miles (2.4 km) north-west of Higham; at Lower Hope Point, about 1.8 miles (2.9 km) north-west of Cliffe; and on the north bank at East Tilbury, about 0.5 miles (0.8 km) north of the old Henrician blockhouse. The batteries would have a maximum range of about 1.5 miles (2.4 km) and their arcs of fire would overlap, enabling them to support each other.

The new battery was constructed during 1799 on marshy ground a short distance south-east of St Catherine's Church. It took its name from the nearby Coalhouse Point, which was named for a coal wharf that once existed there to serve East Tilbury. The soft soil caused many problems but the work was completed by July of that year. It was equipped with four 24-pounder (pdr.) cannon mounted on traversing carriages, which enabled the gunners to track targets much more easily than had been the case with traditional garrison carriages. The battery faced the river with a semi-circular earthen rampart on which the guns were mounted. A walled-off area to the rear enclosed a barracks, magazine and shot kiln (for heating shot to set wooden ships on fire). The whole structure was surrounded by a polygonal water-filled ditch. It was modified in 1810 to raise the height of the rampart and to add a small expense magazine where ammunition was stored for immediate use. The French did not test the Thames defences, despite an invasion scare in 1804, and the battery was abandoned along with those at Lower Hope Point and Shornemead following Napoleon's final defeat in 1815.

=== First Coalhouse Fort ===
Renewed tension between Britain and France in the 1840s led to a modernisation of some of Britain's coastal defences. The batteries at Shornemead and Coalhouse Point were reinstated and upgraded, though the one at Lower Hope Point was never restored. In the case of the Coalhouse battery, it was substantially expanded between 1847 and 1855 to convert it into a fort. The work was slow as the marshy ground caused the foundations to crack and the structure to subside, and the contractor was unsatisfactory.

The new fort was built as an extension to the north-west of the existing battery, and thus took an irregular plan. The rampart was extended to accommodate more guns – a total of seventeen 32-pdrs. – and a much enlarged interior replaced the old barracks and magazine. Caponiers at the east side and firing positions on the other sides facilitated musketry defence against land-based assailants. The fort was surrounded by a wide water-filled ditch. A bridge on the west (landward) side provided the only access route.

=== Second Coalhouse Fort ===
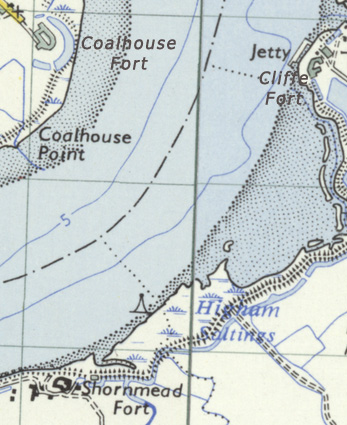
Map of the area of Cliffe, Coalhouse and Shornemead Forts, illustrating how they faced each other across the Thames

By the late 1850s, Britain and France were locked in an arms race. A new generation of increasingly accurate and powerful guns had been developed (of the rifled muzzle loader (RML) and rifled breech loader (RBL) types), mounted on fast-moving, manoeuvrable steam-powered ironclad warships such as the French La Gloire and the British HMS Warrior. Such vessels posed a serious threat to the important naval installations on the Thames, including the victualling yards at Deptford, the armaments works of Woolwich Arsenal, the shipbuilding yards at North Woolwich, and the magazines at Purfleet. It was not possible for large warships to reach central London, as the river was not yet deep enough to take ships of more than 400 tons above Deptford. (Capital dredging later enabled much larger ships to reach as far as the Pool of London.) As the American Civil War was soon to show, it was quite possible for the warships of the day to run past forts and attack up coastal rivers.

The new weapons meant that the existing coastal and riverine forts were rendered largely obsolete. The American Civil War was soon to demonstrate that traditional brick and masonry forts could be reduced to rubble by rifled guns. The government's response was to appoint a Royal Commission on the Defence of the United Kingdom, which published a far-reaching report in 1860. The Royal Commission recommended that a triangle of forts should be established on the lower Thames, east of Gravesend. This would involve replacing the existing Coalhouse Fort on the Essex shore with a new fortification, similarly replacing the existing Shornemead Fort and building the wholly new Cliffe Fort opposite Coalhouse Point, which would replace the abandoned 18th-century battery at Lower Hope Point. The locations of the forts would enable interlocking arcs of fire from their guns. A boom defence and a minefield would be installed off Coalhouse Point in wartime to further boost the strength of the defences.

The design of the new fort was similar to that of the other Royal Commission forts on the Thames, with an arc of granite-faced casemates, reinforced by iron shields. These, it was believed, would be virtually invulnerable to enemy fire. It was originally envisaged that the fort would have two tiers (in a design similar to that of Garrison Point Fort at Sheerness) mounting around 56 guns; 28 in casemates and the rest in barbettes on the fort's roof. Construction began on this basis in July 1861 but as the work progressed the design was changed, leaving the fort with only a single tier of casemates. Like its predecessors, its construction was seriously affected by the poor ground conditions and was disrupted by shifting and cracking foundations. Colonel Charles George Gordon, who was later to die in the siege of Khartoum, supervised its final phases of construction. The fort cost a total of £130,000 to build.

== Operational history ==
=== 19th century ===
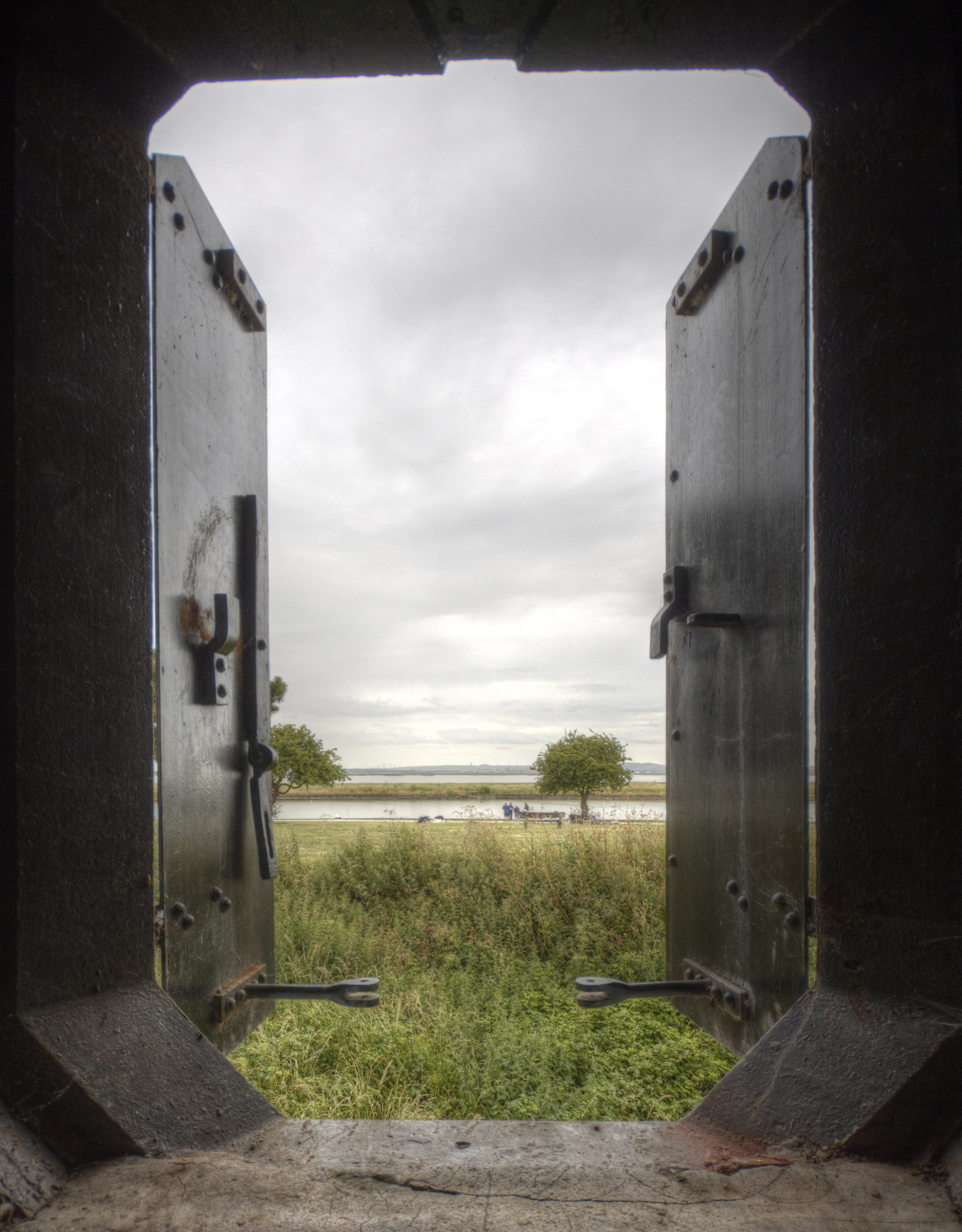
View from a Coalhouse Fort casemate

It was originally intended that Coalhouse Fort would be armed with 68-pdr. smooth-bore guns, but these had become obsolete by the time it was completed in 1874. More powerful armour-piercing weapons were required, so the casemates were provided with four 12.5-inch and thirteen 11-inch RMLs with a range of about 5,500 yards (5,000 m). A further three 9-inch RMLs were emplaced in the open battery. They were mounted on metal traversing platforms that could be elevated and traversed using hand-operated gearing devices. Operating the guns presented significant challenges; the 12.5-inch RMLs weighed up to 38 long tons (39 t) apiece, used a charge weighing 172 pounds (78 kg) to fire a shell weighing 827 pounds (375 kg) to their maximum range, and broke windows half a mile away when they were fired. The detonations and clouds of choking black smoke generated when firing them presented a serious physical hazard to the gun crews.

The guns were controlled from a Battery Commander's Post on the roof, from where commands to the gun detachments could be relayed via voice pipes. Three depression range finders were installed on the roof by the late 1890s to aid the guns' targeting. A well-trained crew could fire each gun once every two minutes. Rather than firing all the guns at once, the guns were positioned so that they could be fired in sequence as an enemy ship passed by. When combined with the fire from Shornemead and Cliffe Forts on the Kent shore, this would ensure that constant fire could be maintained from three different sides.

The rapid development of artillery weapons in the late 19th century meant that the casemate style of fortification had become virtually obsolete within a decade of the fort's completion. Its original purpose of defending the river against large warships was taken over by a new East Tilbury Battery, constructed in 1891 about 600 metres (660 yd) to the north-west just outside East Tilbury village. This contained six much more powerful breech-loading (BL) guns on Moncrieff disappearing carriages within concealed emplacements facing east up the river. A similar battery was built at Slough Fort on the Hoo Peninsula a few miles downriver.

At the same time, a new threat had emerged in the shape of the fast and highly manoeuvrable torpedo boat. Large guns were virtually useless against such vessels, so the fort was supplemented with another new battery built in 1893 some 365 metres (399 yd) to the south where 6-pdr. quick-firing guns were installed. Similar batteries were built on the opposite shore at Shornemead and Cliffe Forts.

=== Early 20th century ===
By the start of the 20th century the fort's casemates had been put out of use as they were too vulnerable to modern artillery. Instead, part of the fort's front was covered with a sloping glacis made of earth, blocking the casemates and filling the inner defensive ditch. At least one of the front caponiers was also demolished around this time. Most of the old RMLs were retired and replaced with four Mk. VII six-inch BL guns and four 12-pdr quick-firing (QF) BL guns, with ranges of 7 miles (11 km) and 4.5 miles (7.2 km) respectively, mounted on concrete emplacements on the fort's roof. The larger guns were intended to support those at East Tilbury Battery while the smaller ones provided a defence against fast-moving vessels such as destroyers and torpedo boats. Despite their obsolescence, two of the old 12.5-inch RMLs remained at the fort until as late as 1912. They were to be used as "giant blunderbusses" to spray torpedo boats with grapeshot if they got past the other guns.

Coalhouse Fort was manned during the First World War by No. 2 Company, Royal Garrison Artillery, which manned the guns; the 2nd Company London Electrical Engineers operated the electric searchlights. A minefield was installed in the river between Shornemead and Coalhouse forts, with mechanically operated mines in the shallower parts of the river and remotely detonated mines in the navigable channel. Friendly ships could thus pass freely but the mines could be detonated by a shore-based observer if an enemy ship tried to use the main channel. Coalhouse Fort took on the role of an Examination Battery controlling the river traffic in conjunction with the River Examination Service. Incoming vessels were checked by tugs based alongside the old HMS Champion, moored in midriver, and if any vessel was deemed suspect or refused to stop, the fort was authorised to fire across its bows.

The fort's armament was reduced during the war as other forts and batteries took over some of its duties. Two of the six-inch guns were shipped across the river to Cliffe Fort in 1914 and the QF guns on the roof were withdrawn. An anti-aircraft battery was established north-west of the fort for defence against Zeppelins and enemy bombers.

=== 1920s to 1940s ===
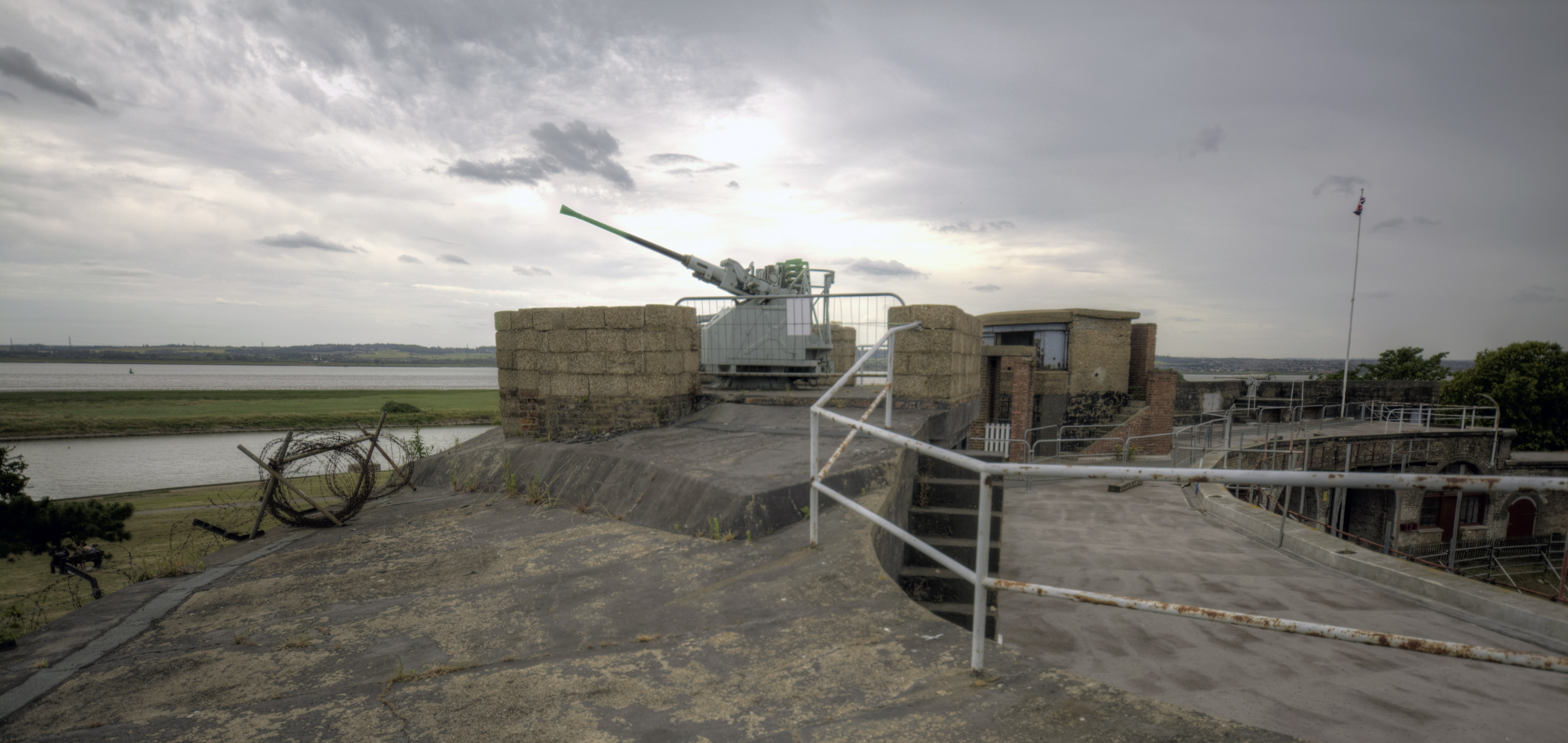
Bofors 40 mm anti-aircraft gun on the roof of Coalhouse Fort

Following the end of the war, it was proposed in 1924 that Coalhouse Fort should be re-equipped with 4-inch guns but post-war defence cuts meant that this plan was abandoned. Instead, the fort was reduced to care and maintenance status and East Tilbury Battery was decommissioned in 1930. The continuing development of artillery firepower meant that the forts and batteries further downriver took on an increased responsibility for the forward defences of the Thames. The forts on Gravesend Reach were relegated to a second line of defence.

Coalhouse Fort became an "emergency" battery during the anti-invasion preparations of the early Second World War. The existing 6-inch guns were replaced in July 1941 with two 5.5-inch guns which had been removed from HMS Hood during a refit in April 1940. These had a range of 12,500 yards (11,400 m) and were installed in two of the old 6-inch emplacements. A steel shelter was constructed on the fort's roof to protect the guns, which were also camouflaged with netting. A brick observation post on the roof provided range-finding, and two remotely controlled searchlights installed on the roof of the north caponier could illuminate the riverside below. The purpose of these installations was to protect against raids by cruisers and torpedo boats and to counter any landings in the Thames.

The fort's defences were also enhanced with two light anti-aircraft guns, including a Bofors 40 mm gun installed on the roof in August 1943, while the fort's perimeter was surrounded by barbed wire and trenches. Two spigot mortars were installed at the fort's rear; their bases can still be seen today. A detached concrete observation tower was built just north of the fort for use as an Extended Defence Officer's Post, to control the electrically detonated mines that had been laid in the river. A radar tower manned by naval personnel was also built south of the fort by 1941 to cover the approaches to the minefield, and an anti-aircraft battery was built 1,100 metres (1,200 yd) to the north-west at Bowaters Farm in August 1939. It was frequently used in defence of the eastern approaches to London and was bombed on more than one occasion.

By 1944 the threat of invasion had abated and the fort was handed over to the Home Guard's No. 356 Coast Battery detachment. Its complement at this time was a captain, two lieutenants and 103 other ranks. They were supplemented by a detachment of Wrens who operated a degaussing range established at Coalhouse Fort in 1943 under the name of HMS St Clement. Outbound ships passed over submerged sensors which detected whether the steel in their hulls had been demagnetised to a sufficient extent to make them undetectable by German magnetic mines. If they were detected, they would be recalled for further degaussing. As one of the Wrens later recalled, they found themselves "surrounded by a wonderful array of young men, soldiers and marines of all ranks – and we were the only girls in sight."

HMS St Clement became a Combined Operations base and evolved into HMS St Clement I, II and III. As HMS St Clement III, the fort's last military designation, it was used after 1946 by the Admiralty for training Sea Cadets and nautical youth groups. It was decommissioned in 1949.

== Architecture ==
=== Casemates ===
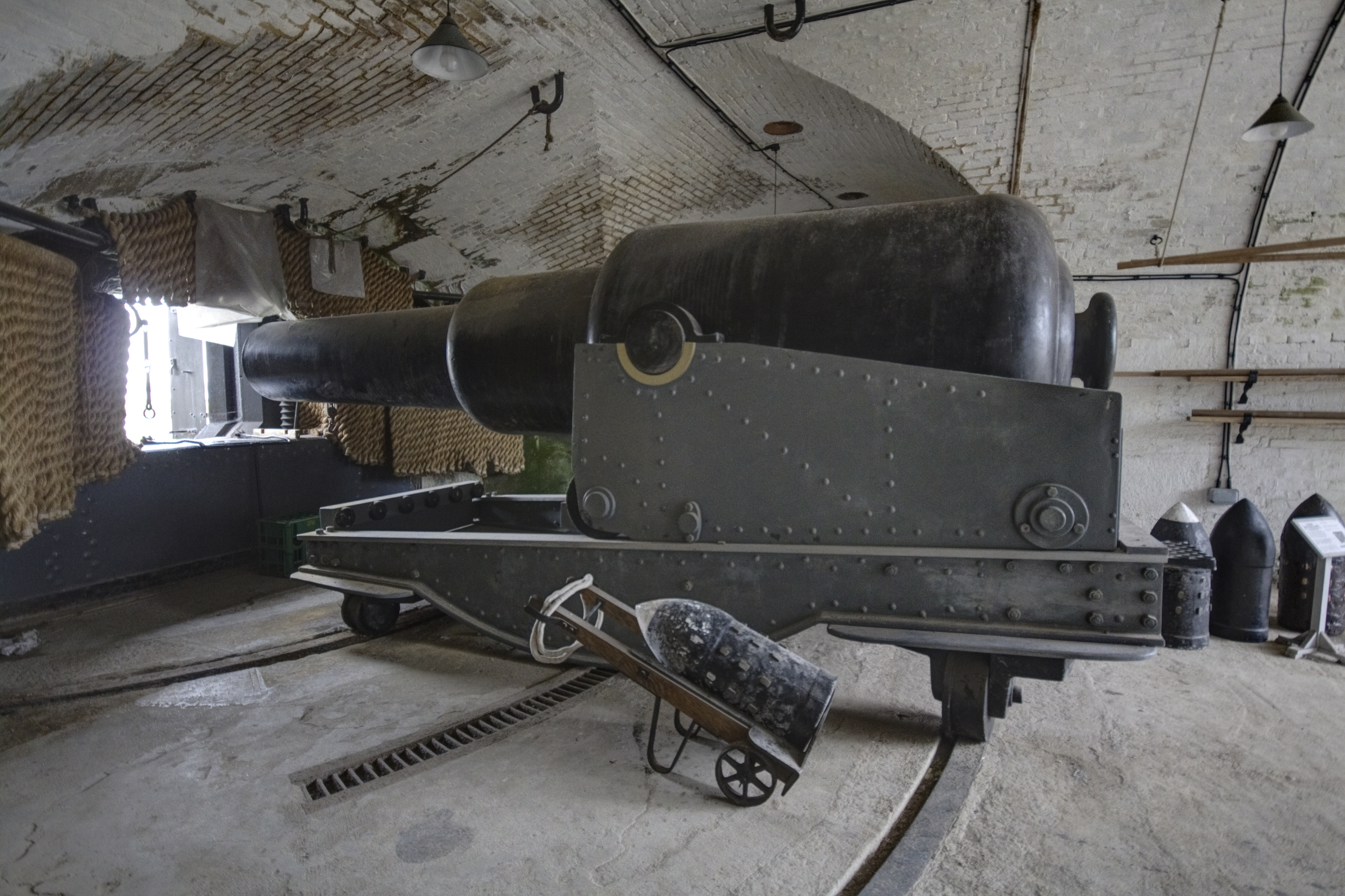
Restored casemate with replica 12.5-inch RML gun

Coalhouse Fort is exceptionally well-preserved; it provides one of the finest surviving examples of a mid-Victorian armoured casemate fort. It has twelve casemates arranged in a semi-circle facing south and east towards the river, with an annexed open battery facing south-west. The casemates are faced with massive slabs of granite and have iron gun ports to protect the gunners from splinters dislodged by incoming fire.

Although the casemates have been altered over the years, many of their original features survive. None of the guns remain in situ but the metal rails on which they traversed are still in place. The casemates were divided into two sections. During periods of high alert the gun crews would live next to their weapons in the casemates' rear, an area known as the war accommodation. The front of the casemate was the gun emplacement proper, where the loading and firing took place. The iron shield protecting each casemate was fitted with iron bars from which two mantlets made of thick lengths of rope were hung. These protected the gun crew from splinters and smoke. A loading bar above the gun-port enabled the crew to lift the heavy shells and cartridges up to the mouth of the gun. These were dispensed from the magazines below via lifts on either side of the emplacements.

The guns mounted in the open battery were lighter than those in the casemates and were not enclosed but traversed on rails in the open air. A covered section between each emplacement led to an ammunition lift shaft up which the shells and cartridges were raised using lifting gear that still survives.

Improvements to artillery technology necessitated significant changes to the fort's structure towards the end of the 19th century and the start of the 20th. Closely packed casemates of the type built at Coalhouse Fort were vulnerable to new and more powerful types of explosive shells. To alleviate this threat, massive concrete traverses were constructed in the 1880s to isolate each casemate, preventing a shell bursting inside one casemate from affecting its neighbours and causing a cumulative explosion. The construction of concrete gun emplacements on the fort's roof necessitated the installation of circular concrete pillars within the casemates to support the extra weight on the roof. The ammunition lifts were also extended to serve the new roof-mounted guns.

=== Magazines, barracks and roof ===
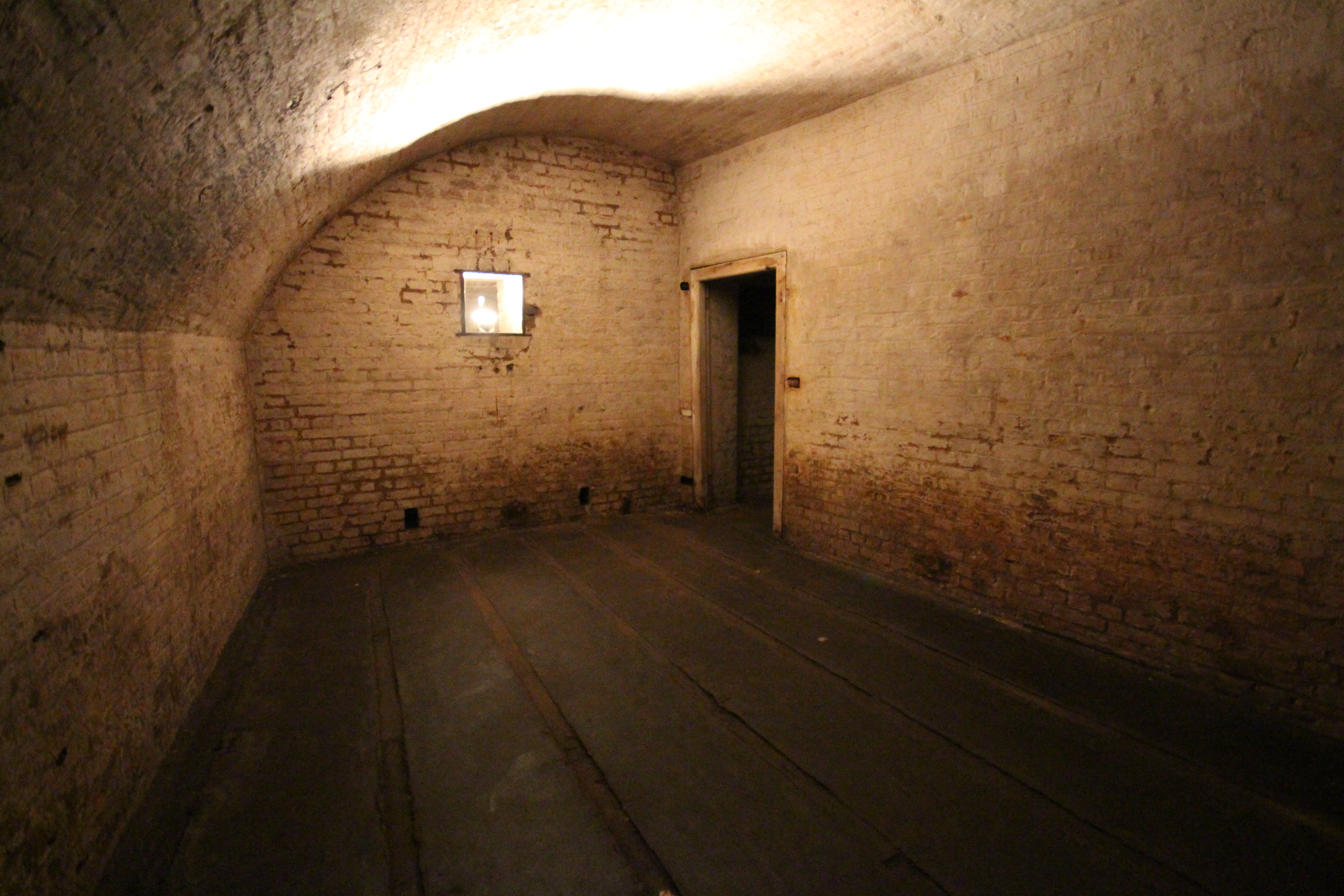
Cartridge magazine in Coalhouse Fort. The grooves on the floor originally accommodated wooden battens.

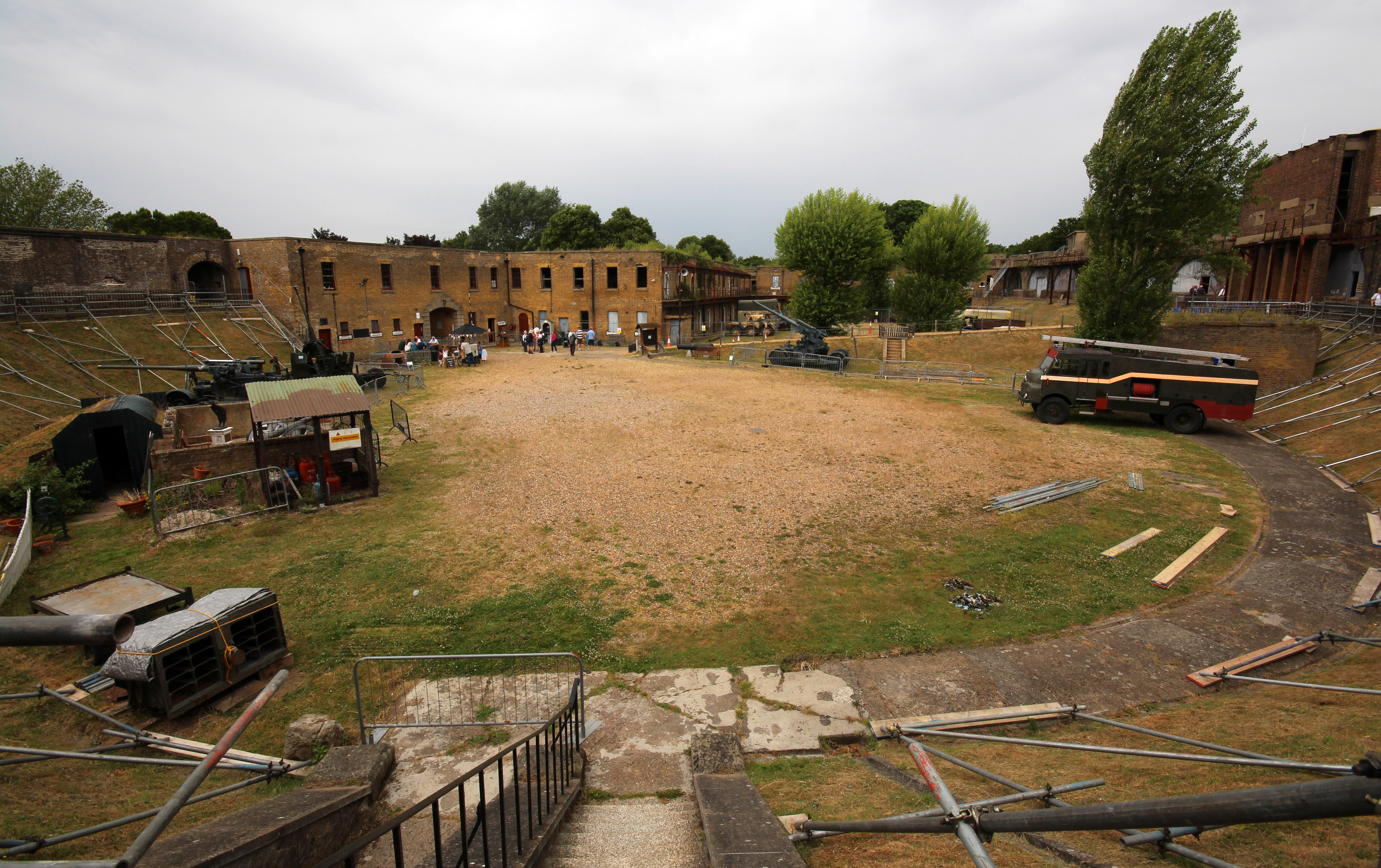
South-east end of Coalhouse Fort's parade ground

The magazines, situated deep under the casemates, consist of alternating pairs of shell and cartridge rooms accessed via an ammunition passage at the front and a lighting passage behind. Great care was taken to reduce the possibility of an accidental explosion. The magazine workers wore special clothes and shoes to eliminate the risk of striking sparks and the floors of the cartridge stores were covered by wooden battens. The lighting was provided from oil lamps situated behind glass windows and accessed only from the lighting passage, which was physically separated from the rest of the magazine. Sets of lifting gear enabled the workers to winch the cartridges and ammunition up to the casemates, with which they could communicate via voice tubes.

A defensible barracks made of brick, faced in Kentish ragstone on the fort's exterior, closes off the gorge. Its line is indented to facilitate small arms fire from loopholes and windows with armoured steel shutters. The first floor of the barracks had a veranda facing towards the fort's interior and supported on cast-iron pillars. The barracks provided accommodation for a wartime complement of six officers and 180 NCOs and men, though in peacetime only small maintenance detachments occupied the fort. It also accommodated storerooms and a hospital with room for fourteen patients. Although much of the barracks is now in poor condition, two of the kitchen ranges still survive and two rooms still contain service crests painted on their walls during the Second World War.

An irregularly shaped parade area occupies the middle of the fort, which is divided by a sloping ramp leading up to the casemates. A small brick building – originally used as a laboratory or shell-filling facility – stands to the right of the ramp. The fort is entered through a single gateway on its west side, protected against landward attackers by a caponier. The front of the fort was surrounded by a dry ditch, in which there were originally four caponiers to provide musketry defence. A very wide outer wet ditch blocked access from the riverside.

The roof of the fort, accessed via steps up from the open battery, was altered substantially during the first half of the 20th century to accommodate new guns and other structures. These include emplacements for 5.5-inch and 6-inch guns as well as 12-pdrs, searchlight positions, shelters, an observation post, a fire control building, a machine-gun parapet on the north caponier and a Royal Navy monitoring station.

=== External facilities ===
The fort was linked to a jetty, Coalhouse Wharf, on the riverside a short distance to the south. A standard gauge railway track led from the fort's interior to the jetty and was used to bring guns and supplies from the wharf. The heaviest guns were transported to and from Coalhouse Fort (and other Thames forts) aboard two specialised gun barges called Gog and Magog, built in 1886 and 1900 respectively and used until the 1960s. The remains of the jetty are still visible, as are sections of the track within the fort's entrance.

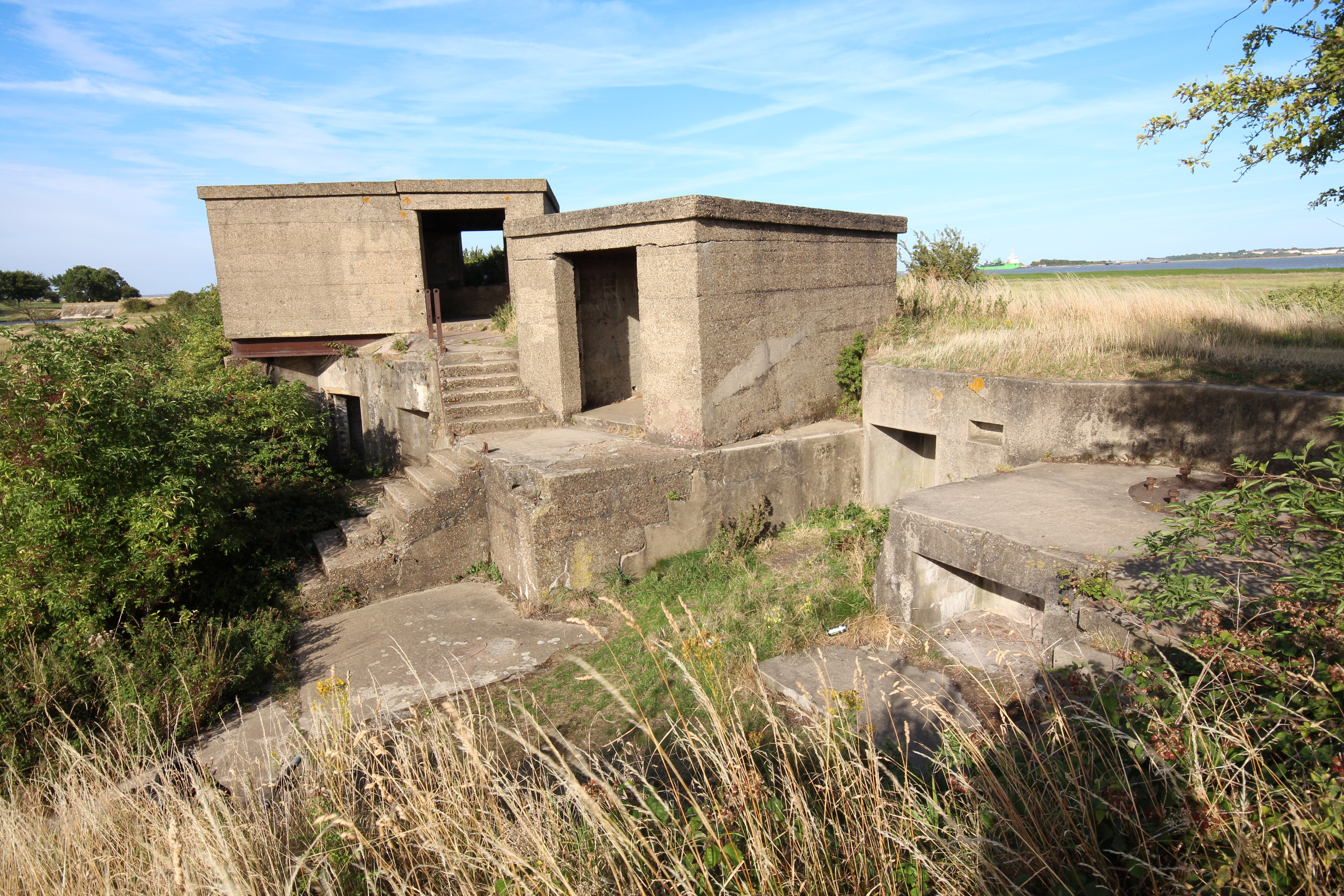
Detached wing battery (1893)

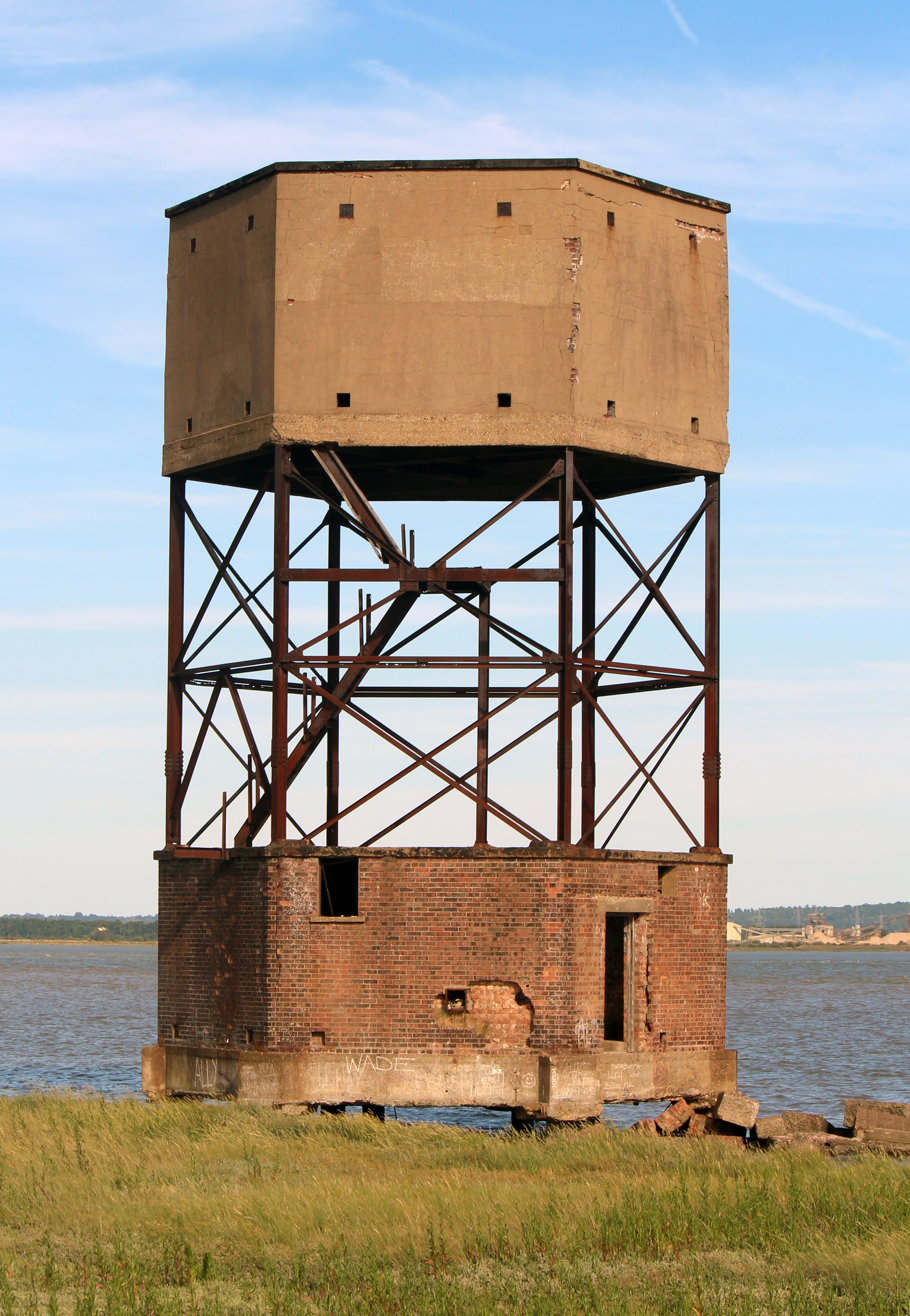
Radar tower
(Second World War)

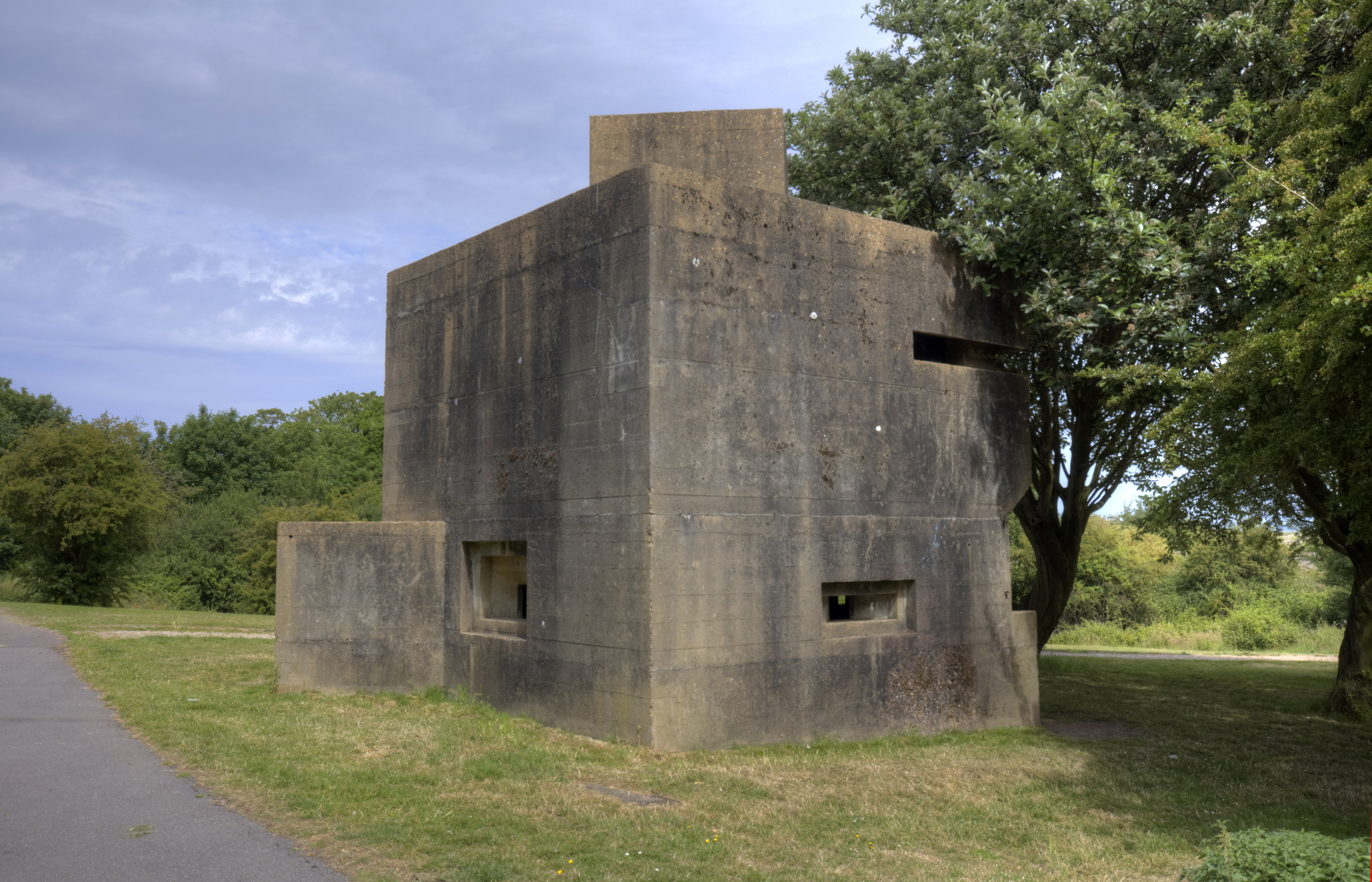
Extended Defence Officer's Post (Second World War)

A two-storey concrete structure just north of the fort was used during the Second World War as an Extended Defence Officer's Post to control the minefield outside the fort. It could also serve as a pillbox. A corresponding post stood on the Kent shore. A small concrete structure a further 148 feet (45 m) north-east of the fort may have been an electrical power house. The minefield was overlooked by a hexagonal radar tower about 1,300 feet (400 m) south of the fort, consisting of a concrete structure on a metal frame on which the radar array was mounted. This stands atop a brick building in which the power plant, electrical equipment radar screen and personnel accommodation were located. It was only used for a short time between 1941 and 1943 and is now considered structurally unsafe. Situated nearby is the detached battery built in 1893 to mount four 6-pdr. quick-firing guns. It is well-preserved and the emplacements, ready-use lockers and magazines are all still largely intact.

== Current status ==
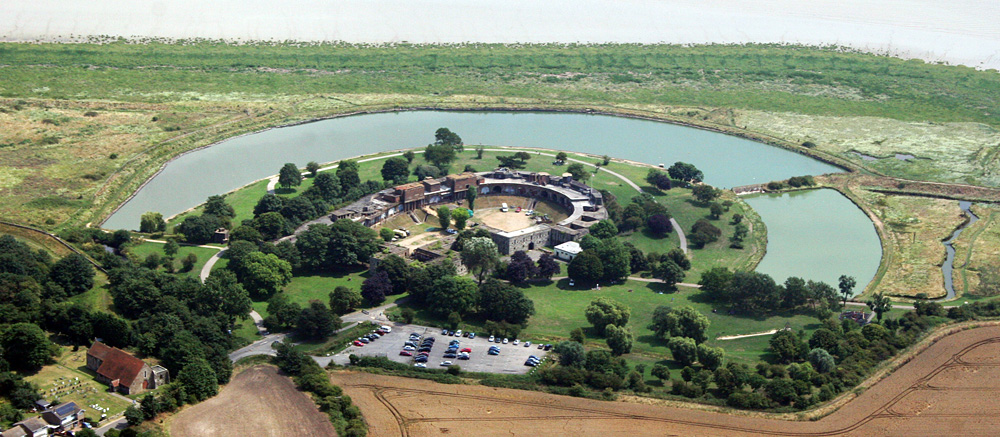
Aerial view of Coalhouse Fort in 2014

After being decommissioned, Coalhouse Fort was leased and used as a storage facility by Bata Shoes, which operated the nearby Bata shoe factory in East Tilbury. It was also used for a while for emergency housing for demobilised servicemen and their families. In 1959, the parade ground was used as a coal store during a miners' strike. Thurrock Urban District Council (now Thurrock Council) purchased the fort in 1962 and still own it. The council turned the area around the fort into a riverside park but the building itself decayed badly through neglect and vandalism.

Coalhouse Fort and the adjacent artillery defences to the south of the fort were collectively designated as a scheduled monument in 1962, in recognition of their status as "a remarkable group of defensive sites".

The fort was leased to the Coalhouse Fort Project, a heritage charity operated by volunteers between 1985 and 2020. The project undertook the gradual restoration of the fort and held regular open days. Various items of 20th century military equipment were displayed in the interior of the fort; the casemates housed reconstructions and small military-related museums. The project was highly commended in the British Archaeological Awards and the fort has featured both in the BBC series Restoration and in the 2005 film Batman Begins, in which it stood in for a Bhutanese prison in the first five minutes of the film. The British director Christopher Nolan had seen the TV series and decided that he wanted to set the film's opening scenes in the fort.

The poor condition of parts of the structure and its state of slow decay led to it be listed in 2008 on the Heritage at Risk Register. English Heritage provided an emergency grant in 2009, supplemented by Thurrock Council and the filming fee from Warner Bros. for Batman Begins, to help make £200,000 worth of repairs to the gatehouse. These were completed in 2011. Grants from Veolia Thames and Thurrock Council, via the Heritage Lottery Fund, have funded the construction of a new block outside the fort entrance to house a cafe, toilets and information centre. A four-mile (6.4 km) riverside walk known as the Two Forts Way links Coalhouse Fort with its older counterpart Tilbury Fort; it is described as "a challenging route suitable for able bodied walkers and experienced cyclists." Funded by the newly restructured Historic England (formerly English Heritage), a survey of the heritage site was completed in early 2017 and repairs to make the fort watertight were expected to begin in late 2017.

In January 2020, the Coalhouse Fort Project was discontinued in recognition of its success in saving and restoring the fort, leaving the site's future direction to Thurrock Council and the Heritage Lottery Fund.
