= Shornemead Fort =

Fort on the Thames in Kent, England

- close to Higham, Kent
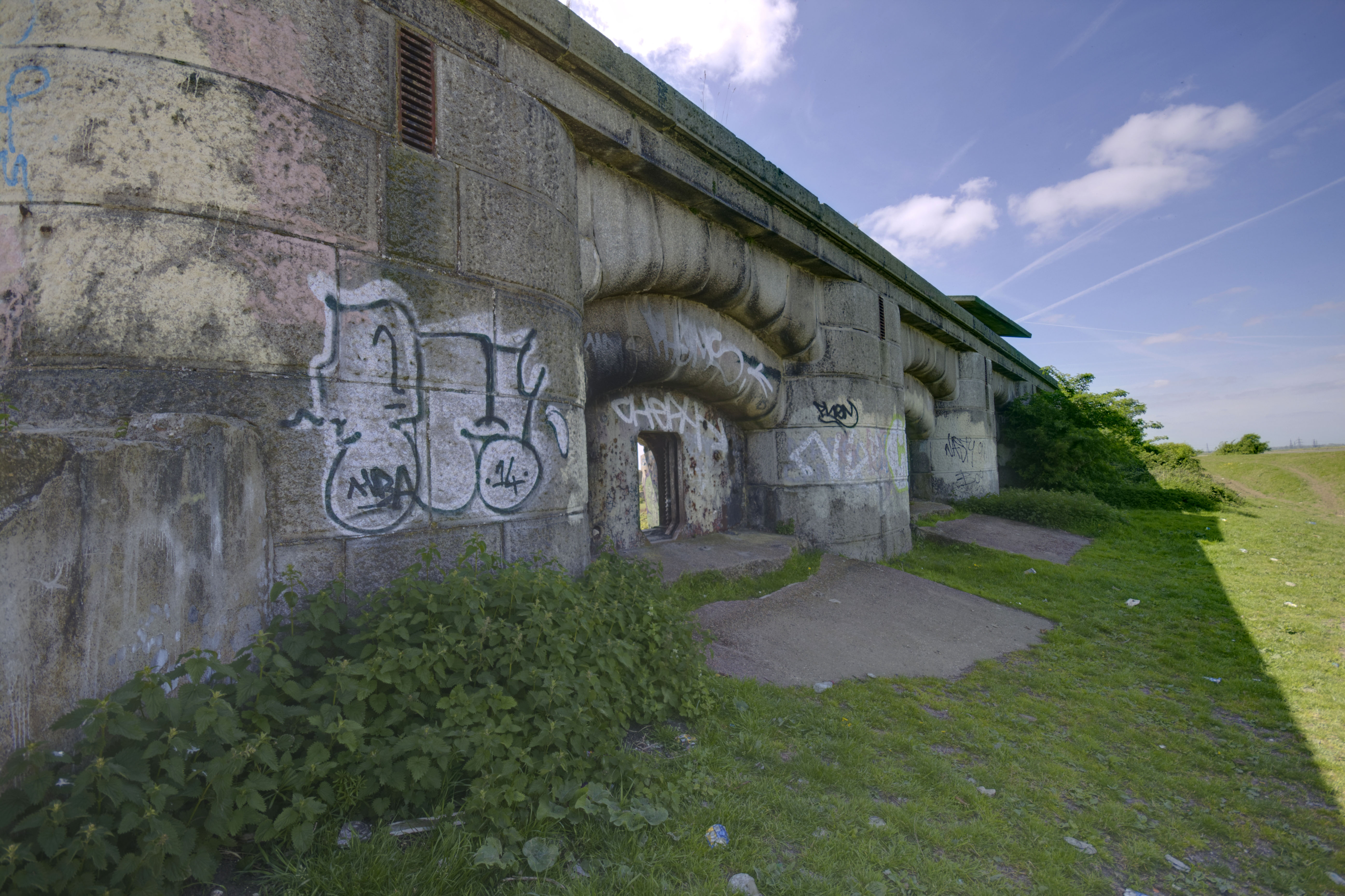
- View of the exterior of the casemates of Shornemead Fort

Site information
- Type: Fortification
- Controlled by: Royal Society for the Protection of Birds
- Open to the public: Yes
- Condition: Mostly demolished

Location
- Coordinates: 51.446768°N 0.434059°E

Site history
- Built: ca. 1861–70
- Built by: United Kingdom
- In use: 1870–1950s
- Materials: Concrete, granite
- Demolished: 1960s
- Battles/wars: First World War, Second World War

Shornemead Fort is a now-disused artillery fort that was built in the 1860s to guard the entrance to the Thames from seaborne attack. Constructed during a period of tension with France, it stands on the south bank of the river at a point where the Thames curves sharply north and west, giving the fort long views up and downriver in both directions. It was the third fort constructed on the site since the 18th century, but its location on marshy ground led to major problems with subsidence. The fort was equipped for a time with a variety of large-calibre artillery guns which were intended to support two other nearby Thamesside forts. However, the extent of the subsidence meant that it became unsafe for the guns to be fired and the fort was disarmed by the early 20th century.

Shornemead Fort was in use from its completion in 1870 to its abandonment in the 1950s. Much of it was demolished by the Army Demolition School of the Royal Engineers in the 1960s. The barracks and administrative buildings have been completely destroyed and only the front of the casemates survives along with the magazines underneath, though the latter are now flooded and inaccessible. The surviving fragments of the fort and the area around it are part of a nature reserve and can be visited by the public.

== Early development ==
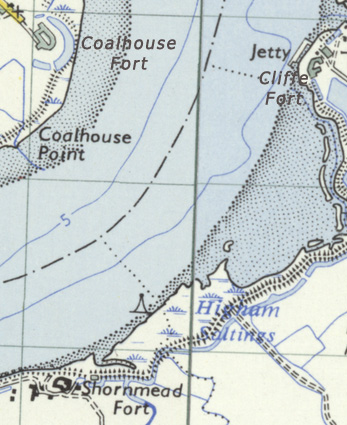
Map of the area of Cliffe, Coalhouse and Shornemead Forts

The Thames was guarded by a number of forts built around Gravesend and Tilbury in the 16th and 17th centuries but these were inadequate against the threat of the new generation of artillery that had emerged by the end of the 18th century. An artillery battery was established farther downriver at Shornemead in 1795–96, during the Napoleonic Wars, along with two other batteries at Lower Hope Point on the Kent side and Coalhouse Point on the Essex side. It was a small pentagonal structure with earthen ramparts, within which four 24-pdr. guns were mounted in open emplacements, with a range of 2.3 km (1.4 mi). The first Shornemead Fort was provided with a barracks, magazine and defensible gorges and was planted with walnut trees nearby to supplement the garrison's food supply and provide wood for the stocks of their muskets.

After the defeat of Napoleon the battery was abandoned. It was rebuilt in the mid-1840s, along with Coalhouse Fort. The second Shornemead Fort was constructed between 1848–52 to a polygonal plan inspired by the ideas of the French military engineer Montalembert, in a novel move away from the bastioned trace design used in other British forts of the time. It was an open battery like the first fort, but with much more numerous and powerful artillery – thirteen 32-pdr. guns on traversing carriages, each with a range of 2.7 km (1.7 mi). The ramparts occupied three sides of the fort, facing the river. A barracks was constructed on the remaining two (landward) sides, along with bomb-proof magazines and defensive caponiers to flank the fort's ditch. The marshy ground caused major problems and the fort was not completed until 1853. Subsidence badly cracked the cookhouse and barracks, and one of the caponiers split away from the rest of the structure.

By the late 1850s, Britain and France were locked in an arms race. A new generation of increasingly accurate and powerful guns had been developed (of the Rifled Muzzle Loader (RML) and Rifled Breech Loader (RBL) types), mounted on fast-moving, manoeuvrable steam-powered ironclad warships such as the French La Gloire and the British HMS Warrior. Britain's coastal defences had not been substantially upgraded since the Napoleonic Wars and the country's existing fortifications were largely obsolete. The Thames possessed several naval installations of great importance, including the victualling yards at Deptford, the armaments works of Woolwich Arsenal, the shipbuilding yards at North Woolwich, and the magazines at Purfleet. It was not possible for large warships to reach central London, as the river was not yet deep enough to take ships of more than 400 tons above Deptford. As the American Civil War soon showed, it was quite possible for the warships of the day to run past forts and attack up coastal rivers.

The government's response was to appoint a Royal Commission on the Defence of the United Kingdom, which published a far-reaching report in 1860. It recommended that a triangle of forts should be established on the lower Thames, east of Gravesend. This would involve replacing the old Coalhouse Fort on the Essex shore with a new fortification, similarly replacing the existing Shornemead Fort and building a wholly new fort at Cliffe. The location of the forts would enable interlocking arcs of fire from their guns. It was originally intended that the forts would form part of a line of defences running all the way to Chatham, but the rest of this chain was never built. Shornemead was regarded as being in a particularly strategic location as it commanded river bends at which ships would have to slow down, making them more vulnerable.

== Construction ==
The third and final iteration of Shornemead Fort was constructed between 1861 and 1870 at an estimated cost of £211,063. The fort and its counterparts at Coalhouse Point and Cliffe were designed, except for their ironwork, by Captain Siborne of the Royal Engineers. The iron and steel shields of their casemates were developed by Captain English and Lieutenant English of the Royal Engineers. It was substantially larger than its predecessor, replacing the vulnerable open emplacements with immensely strong casemates capable of resisting direct artillery fire. They were over 635 mm (25.0 in) thick, with layers of steel and wood faced with granite. The original plans envisaged the roof of the fort being used to emplace fourteen guns behind shields and a masonry parapet. Two pivot guns and twenty other guns would be housed at ground level within casemates. However, subsidence caused by the marshy ground was again a problem for the fort builders. The design could not be realised in its original form and it underwent substantial changes in 1867, part-way through construction.

Plans of Shornemead Fort
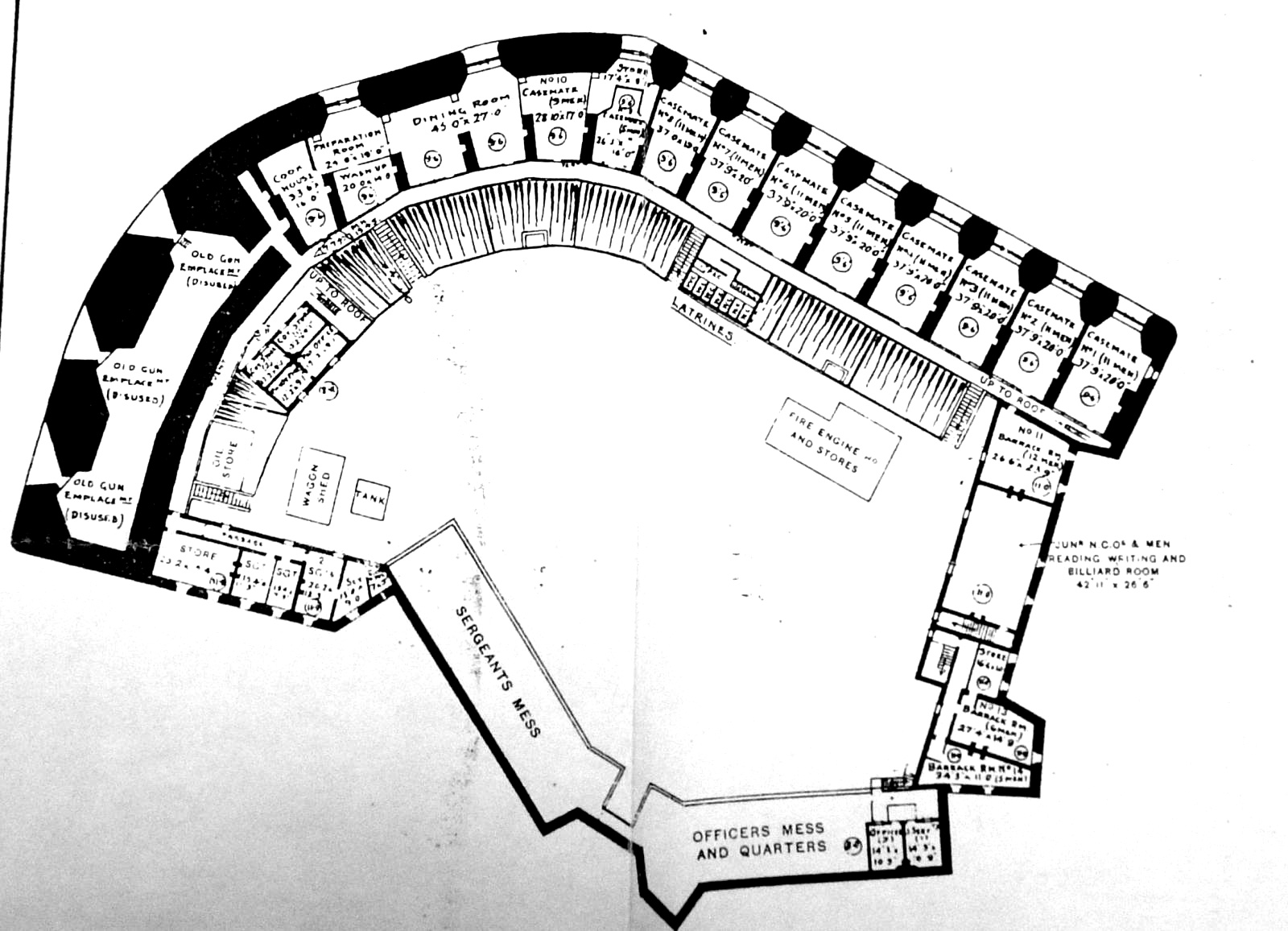
Plan of the upper (casemates) level

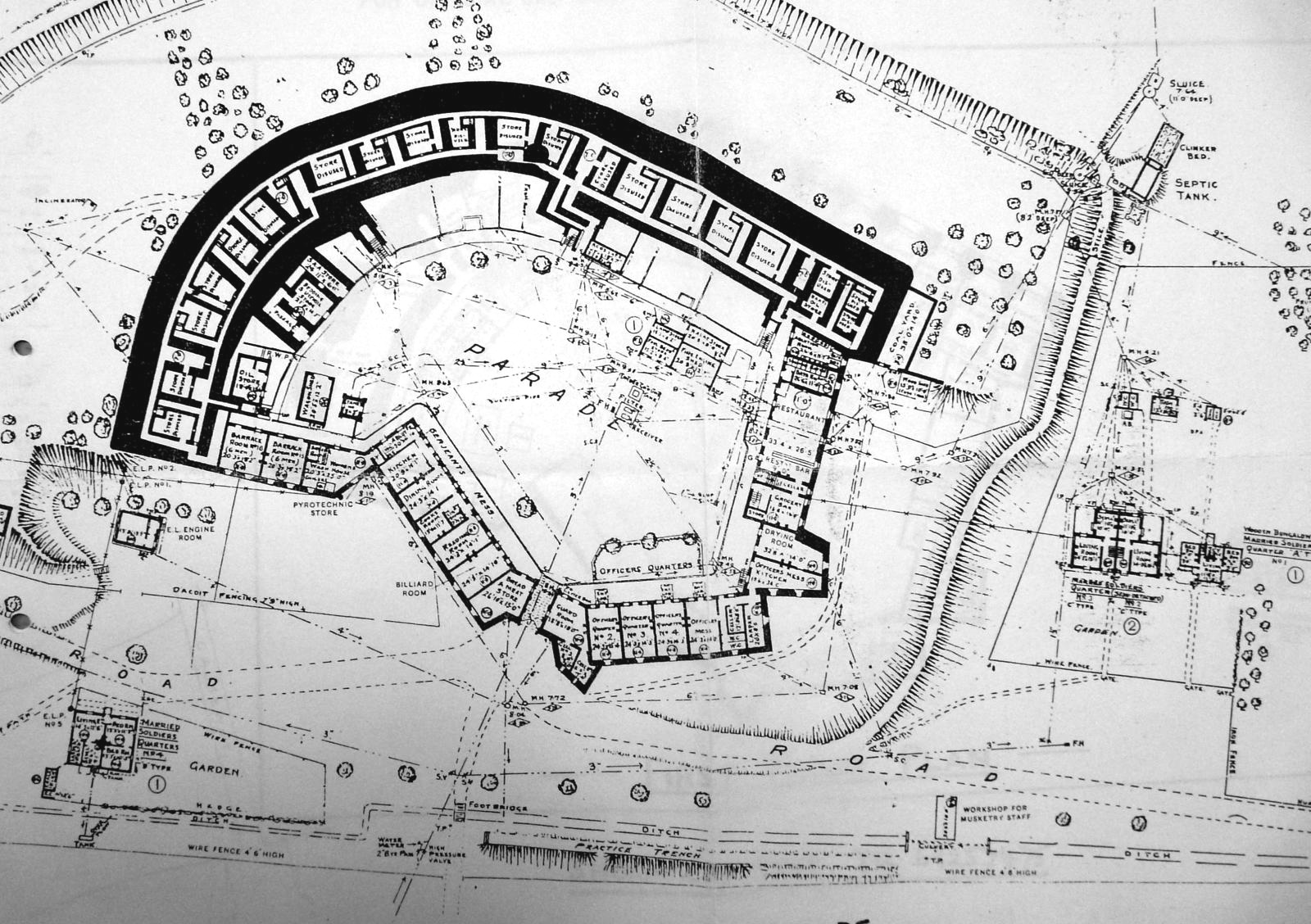
Plan of the lower (magazines) level

In the final design, the plan to put guns on the fort's roof were abandoned. Instead, eleven casemates were placed in an arc on one side of the D-shaped fort, pointing downriver towards Lower Hope Point. An open battery stood at the west end of the casemates, mounting three guns that pointed upriver toward Gravesend and Tilbury. This was to enable artillery support for the older forts at those two towns, which were now relegated to the second line of defence. A single-storey defensible barracks built from Kentish Ragstone stood at the rear of the fort. It was equipped with loopholes so that the garrison could fight off an attack from the landward side. Three caponiers protected the perimeter and an open parade ground occupied the centre of the fort. A ditch originally lay in front of the casemates and open battery but was filled in during the 1880s. The magazines underneath the casemates and open battery consisted of a line of storerooms for shells and cartridges, linked by a lighting passage at the rear and an ammunition passage at the front.

== Operational history ==
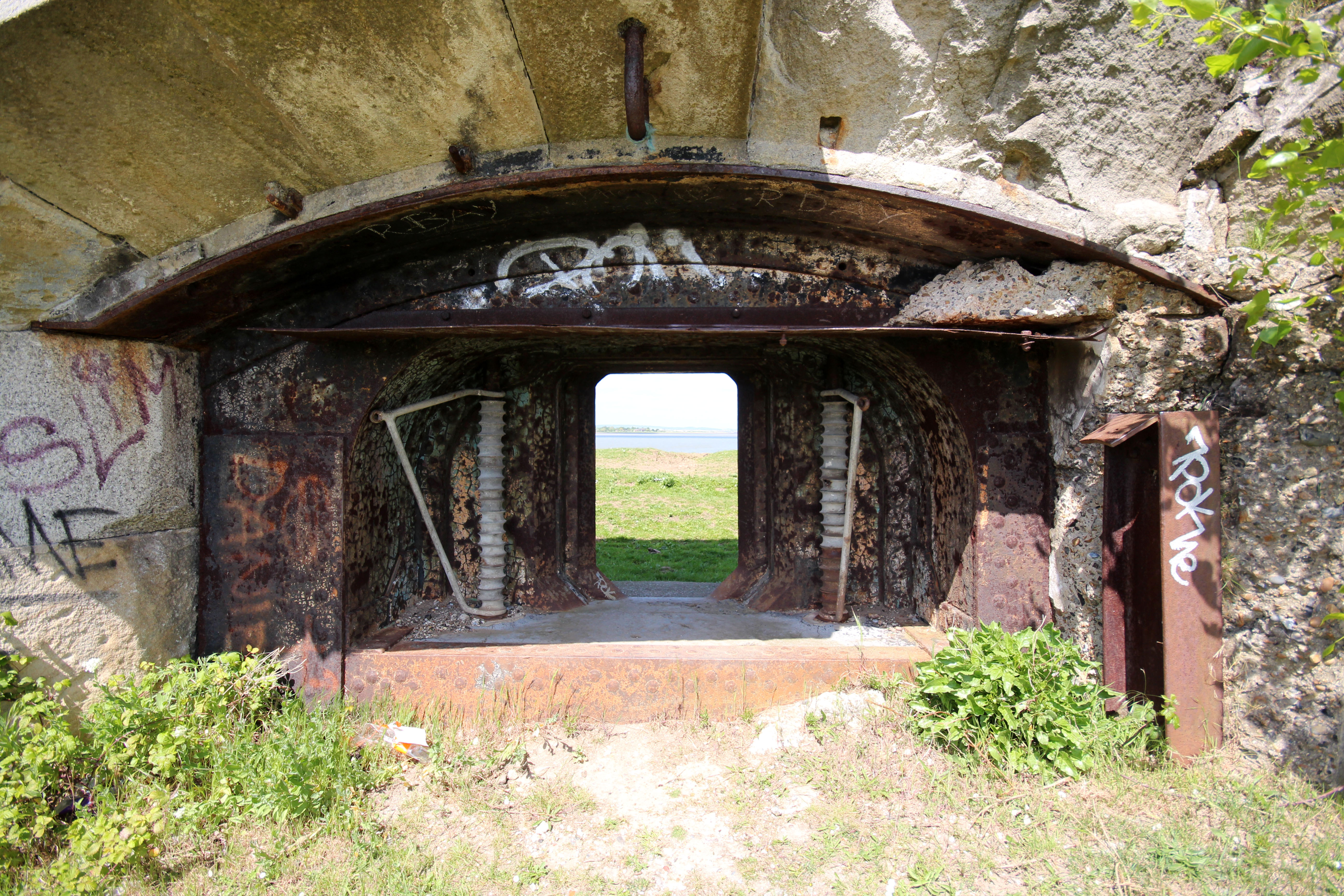
Interior of one of Shornemead Fort's casemates

Shornemead Fort was initially equipped with eleven 11-inch rifled muzzle loaders (RMLs) in casemates, with a range of 5.5 km (3.4 mi), plus another three 9-inch RMLs in the west-facing open battery. They were mounted on special garrison carriages to absorb their recoil and could be trained using traverse rails to alter their direction of fire. In 1895 two 6-pdr. quick-firing (QF) guns were installed on the fort; they were intended to protect a minefield that would be installed in the river in the event of war. Searchlights were also installed in separate emplacements to the west of the fort. Around the same time, a submarine mining establishment was constructed, also located to the west of the fort.

At some point between 1895 and 1907, Shornemead Fort was disarmed. Subsidence had made it structurally unsafe for its emplaced guns to be fired, and it was in any case strategically redundant by that point. It was used for a time by the Thames Militia Division (Submarine Miners), Royal Engineers, as a training facility linked with the nearby submarine mining depot. It was temporarily re-armed in 1913 with two 12-pdr. QF guns in emplacements outside the fort and again in 1941 when it was designated as an emergency battery. Two 5.5-inch naval guns were installed in the same emplacements as the 1913 guns, 250 m (820 ft) east of the fort, with concrete gun houses protecting them. An embarkation hard was constructed on the riverside below the fort to support the D-Day operation. Aerial photographs from the time show the battery, fort, associated concrete pillboxes and searchlights surrounded by dense tangles of barbed wire. The fort was reduced to care and maintenance status in November 1943, while the battery was deactivated in 1945 and demolished around 1976.

The barrack accommodation of Shornemead Fort was used for many years by soldiers training on the nearby Milton rifle range. A permanent staff was based at the fort, and the barracks included lecture rooms, staff accommodation and even a swimming pool built to the east of the fort. The fort was abandoned after the end of World War II and was demolished in the 1960s by the Army Demolition School of the Royal Engineers as part of a training exercise. The staff accommodation and remains of the mining establishment were demolished in the 1970s.

== Current status ==
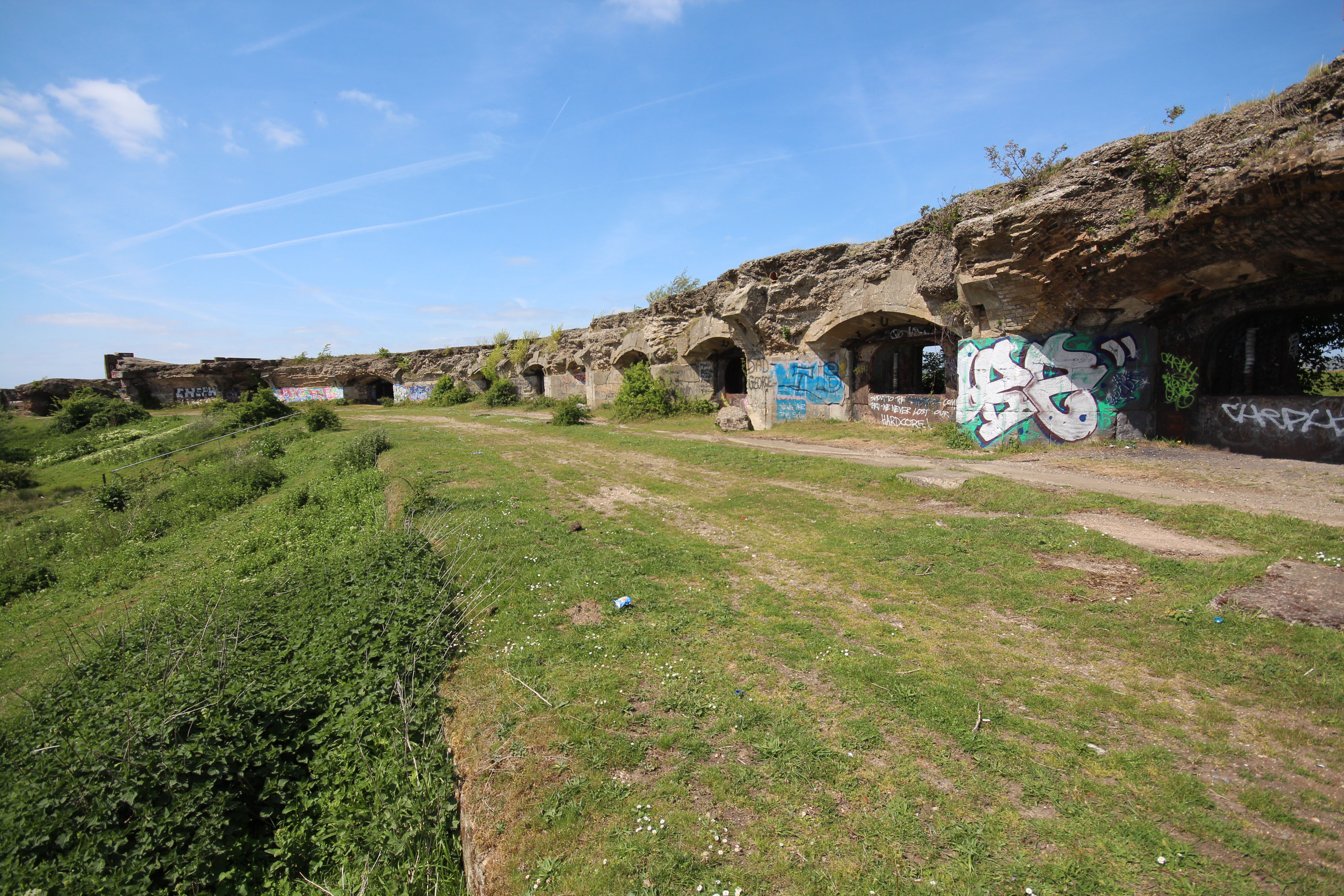
Inside the fort

The fort is now in a mostly destroyed condition with only the front of the casemates standing above ground. Some tidying-up has been performed, but the ruins are vulnerable to vandalism. Nothing remains of the barracks and administrative buildings of the fort. The magazines still exist below ground; they are flooded and were sealed off in 2008. The site can be visited by the public, as it is now part of the Royal Society for the Protection of Birds' Shorne Marshes Nature Reserve. It is linked to the Lower Higham Road by a concrete road originally built by the military to provide access, and is passed by the Saxon Shore Way long-distance footpath.
