= Cliffe Fort =

Disused military installation in Kent, England

- close to Cliffe, Kent
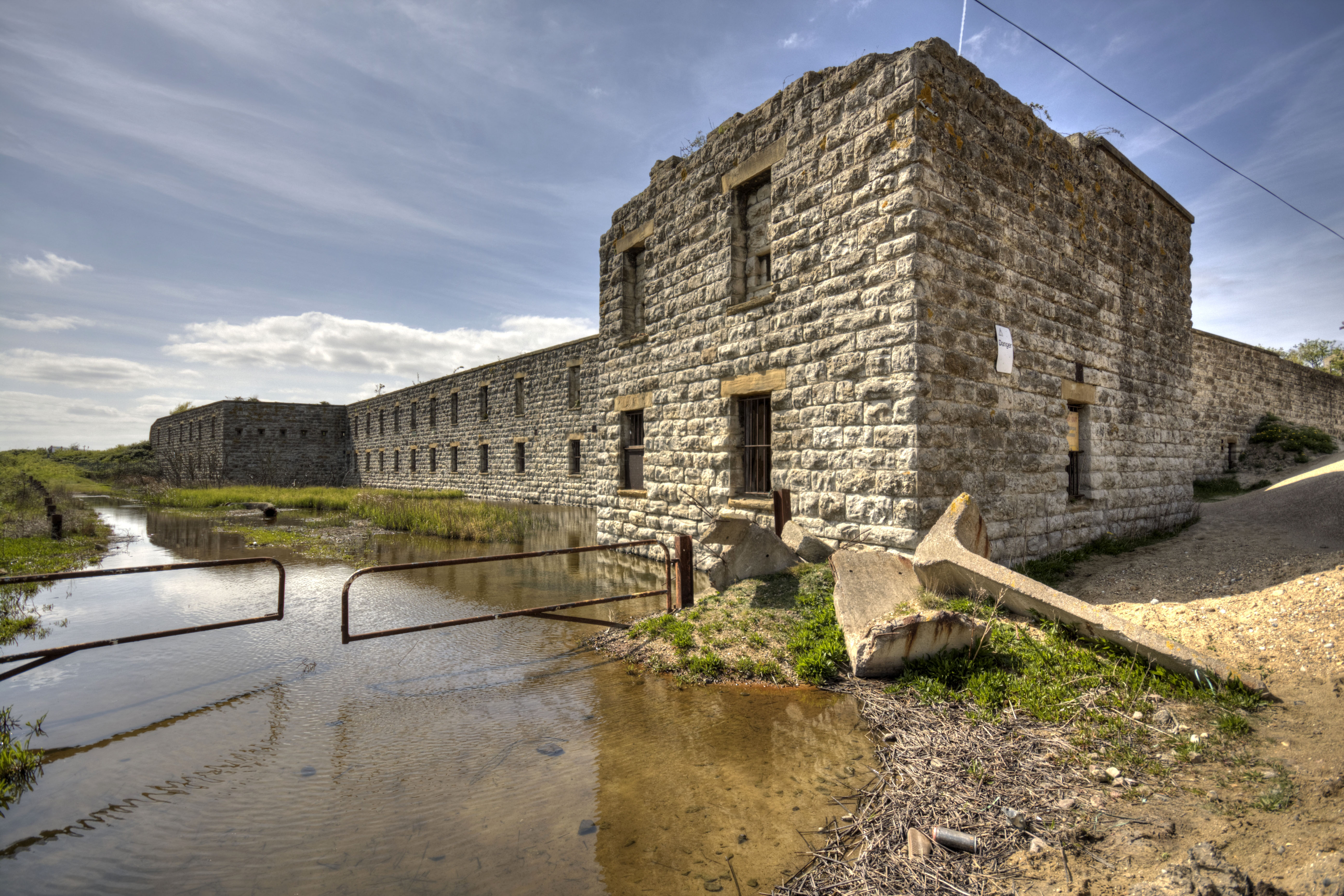
- View of the south-east corner bastion of Cliffe Fort

Site information
- Type: Fortification
- Owner: Brett Aggregates
- Open to the public: No
- Condition: Derelict

Location
- Coordinates: 51.463608°N 0.455871°E

Site history
- Built: ca. 1861–70
- Built by: United Kingdom
- In use: 1870–1950s
- Materials: Concrete, granite
- Battles/wars: World War I, World War II

Cliffe Fort is a disused artillery fort built in the 1860s to guard the entrance to the River Thames from seaborne attack. Constructed during a period of tension with France, it stands on the south bank of the river at the entrance to Cliffe Creek in the Cliffe marshes on the Hoo Peninsula in North Kent, England. Its location on marshy ground caused problems from the start and necessitated changes to its design after the structure begin to crack and subside during construction. The fort was equipped with a variety of large-calibre artillery guns which were intended to support two other nearby Thamesside forts. A launcher for the Brennan torpedo—which has been described as the world's first practical guided missile—was installed there at the end of the 19th century but was only in active use for a few years.

Cliffe Fort saw about 60 years of usage as an artillery fort, from its completion in 1870 to its disarmament in 1927. It was repurposed during World War II to serve as an anti-aircraft battery on the approaches to London. The fort's military career ended when it was sold off after the war to the owners of a neighbouring aggregates works. Today it lies derelict, overgrown and heavily flooded. It is not accessible to the public and is in a poor and slowly deteriorating condition which has led it to be listed as an "at risk" heritage asset.

== Background ==
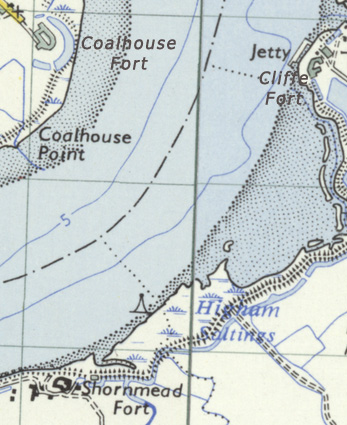
Map of the area of Cliffe, Coalhouse and Shornemead Forts

By the late 1850s, Britain and France were locked in an arms race. A new generation of increasingly accurate and powerful guns had been developed (of the Rifled Muzzle Loader (RML) and Rifled Breech Loader (RBL) types), mounted on fast-moving, manoeuvrable steam-powered ironclad warships such as the French La Gloire and the British HMS Warrior. Such vessels posed a serious threat to the important naval installations on the Thames, including the victualling yards at Deptford, the armaments works of Woolwich Arsenal, the shipbuilding yards at North Woolwich, and the magazines at Purfleet. It was not possible for large warships to reach central London, as the river was not yet deep enough to take ships of more than 400 tons above Deptford. However, as the American Civil War was soon to show, it was quite possible for the warships of the day to run past forts and attack up coastal rivers.

By this time Britain's coastal defences had not been substantially upgraded since the Napoleonic Wars. A number of forts built between the 16th and late 18th centuries stood in the area around Tilbury and Gravesend, west of Cliffe Fort, but like many other existing fortifications in Britain they were by now largely obsolete. The government's response was to appoint a Royal Commission on the Defence of the United Kingdom, which published a far-reaching report in 1860. The Royal Commission recommended that a triangle of forts should be established on the lower Thames, east of Gravesend. This would involve replacing the old Coalhouse Fort on the Essex shore with a new fortification, similarly replacing the existing Shornemead Fort and building a wholly new fort at Cliffe, which would replace an 18th-century battery at Lower Hope Point about 2.1 km (1.3 mi) further downriver. The location of the forts would enable interlocking arcs of fire from their guns.

== Construction ==
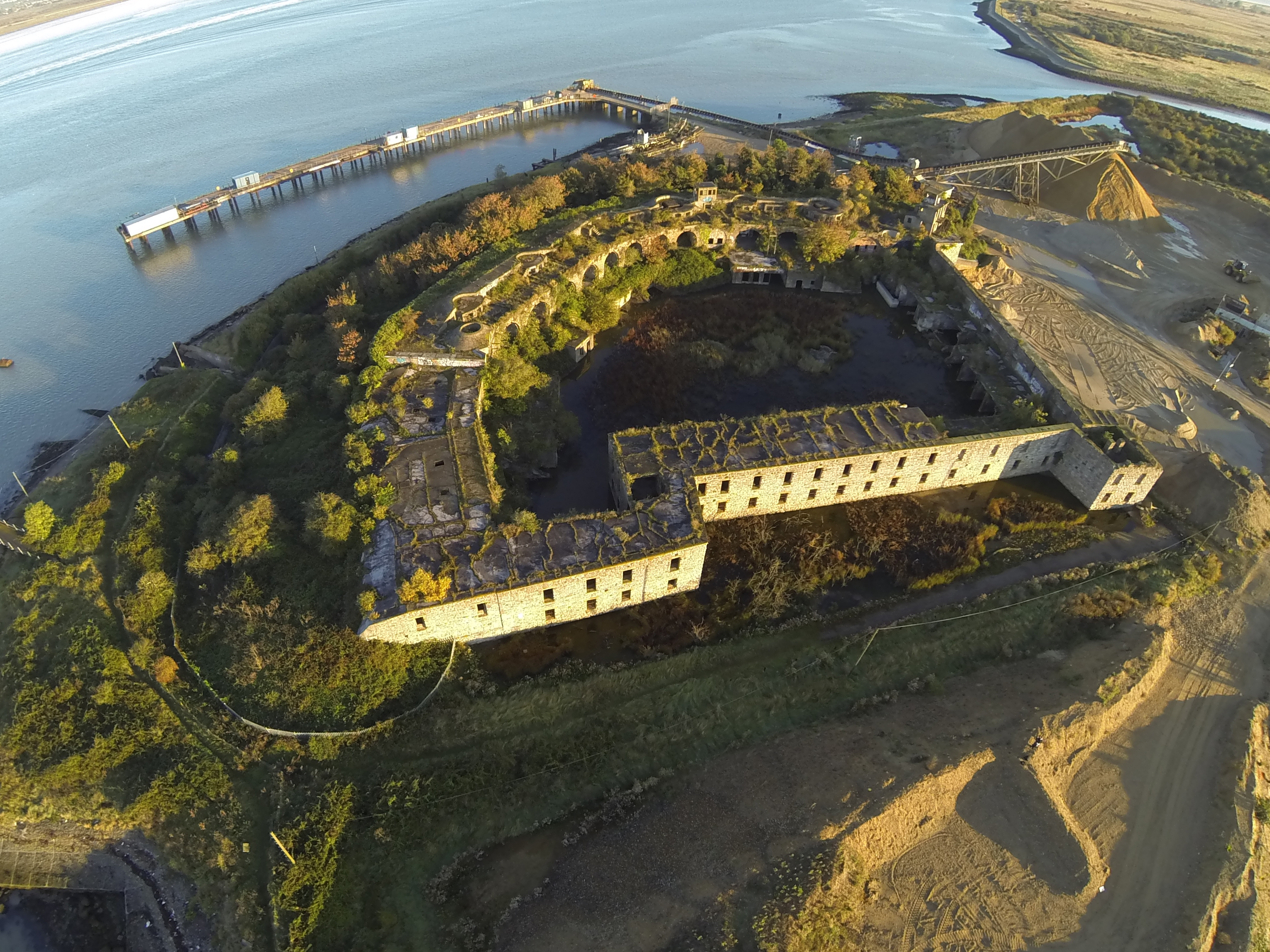
Aerial view of Cliffe Fort

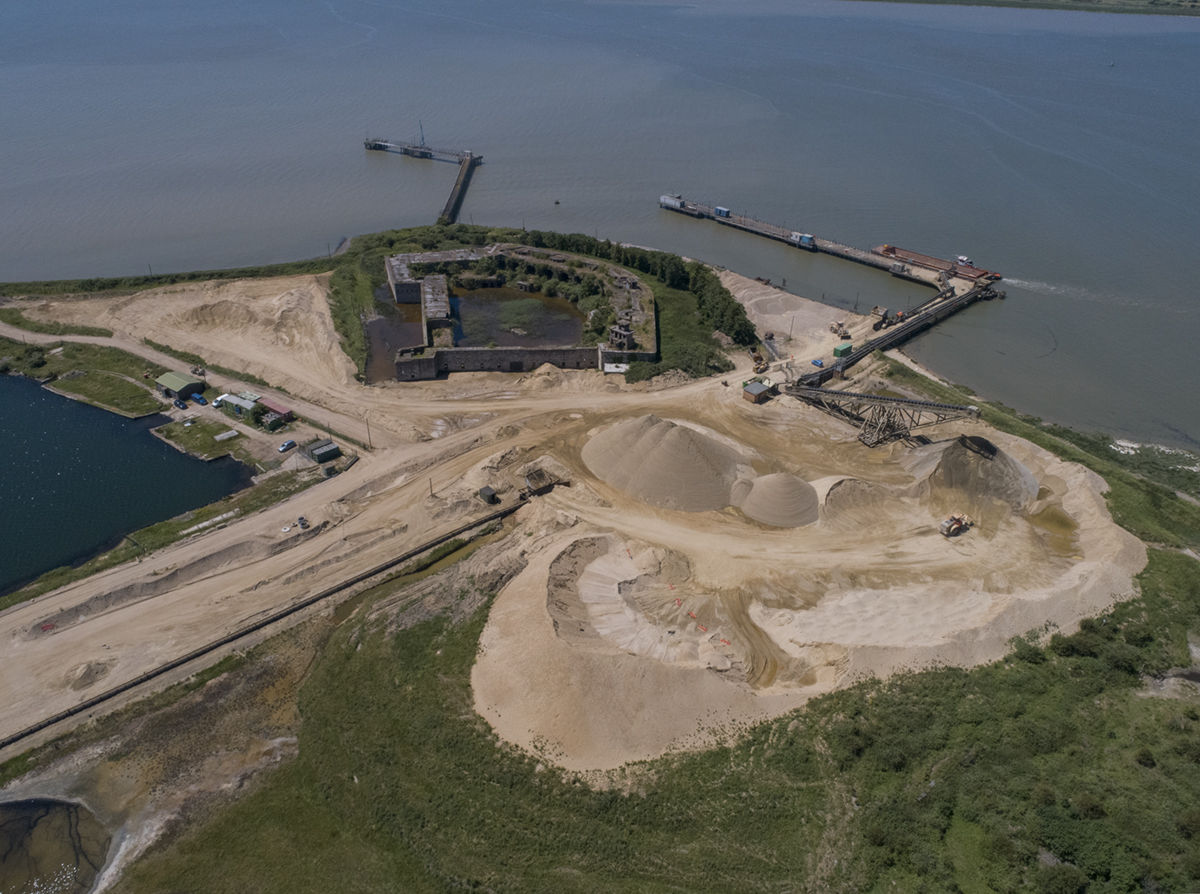
Aerial view of Cliffe Fort as of June 2018

Cliffe Fort was constructed between 1861 and 1870 for an estimated cost of around £163,000. The fort and its counterparts at Coalhouse Point and Shornmead were designed, except for their ironwork, by Captain Siborne of the Royal Engineers. The iron and steel shields of their casemates were developed by Captain English and Lieutenant English of the Royal Engineers. Its original plan called for 13 guns to be mounted on the fort's terreplein or roof, three more to be mounted en barbette and two for land defence. Granite-faced casemates with iron shields would house another 20 guns below. The front would form a quadrant protected by three flanking caponiers for musketry, with two bastioned fronts formed by the gorge building. In addition to the main magazine, the interior of the fort would house four shell filling rooms and four expense magazines. The entire fort would rest on a bed of concrete 7 ft (2.1 m) thick.

However, the problems of building on a marshy site next to the river soon made it necessary to change the plans substantially. The depth of the foundations was increased to utilise a concrete bed 14 ft (4.3 m) thick, supported by piles 30 ft (9.1 m) long. The part-built fort began subsiding and cracking in 1865, causing the abandonment of plans to mount guns on the roof. Instead, the design was modified to make it a purely casemated fort with a very similar aspect to Coalhouse Fort on the other side of the river. A moat and earthworks provided further protection on the riverine side of the fort. Conditions for the men working on the fort's construction were said to be extremely unpleasant, due to the waterlogged conditions. Outbreaks of malaria and bronchitis were persistent problems for the workforce. The Chief Royal Engineer wrote in August 1864 after visiting the site: "The officers' quarters at Cliffe are a mere hut, an abominable stinking place in summer, very cold and wet in winter. It stands by the side of a foul ditch which cannot be cleaned, for the mere disturbing of its contents would endanger the health of the officers."

== Operational history ==
Floor plans

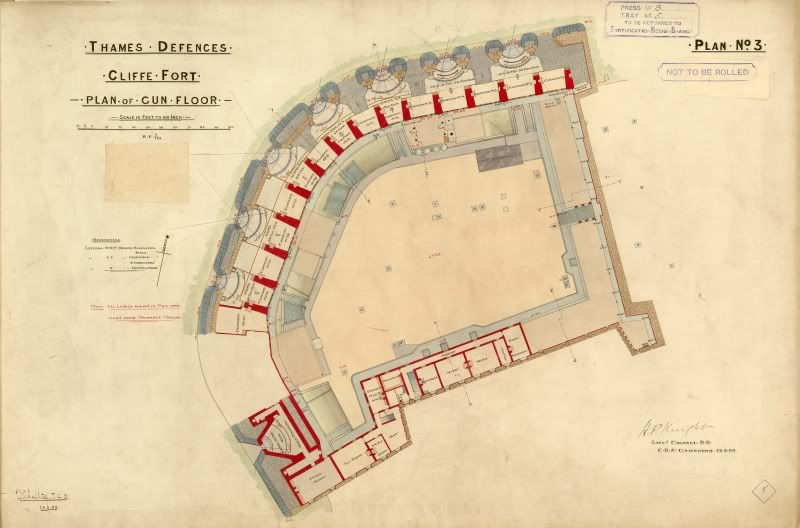
Gun floor

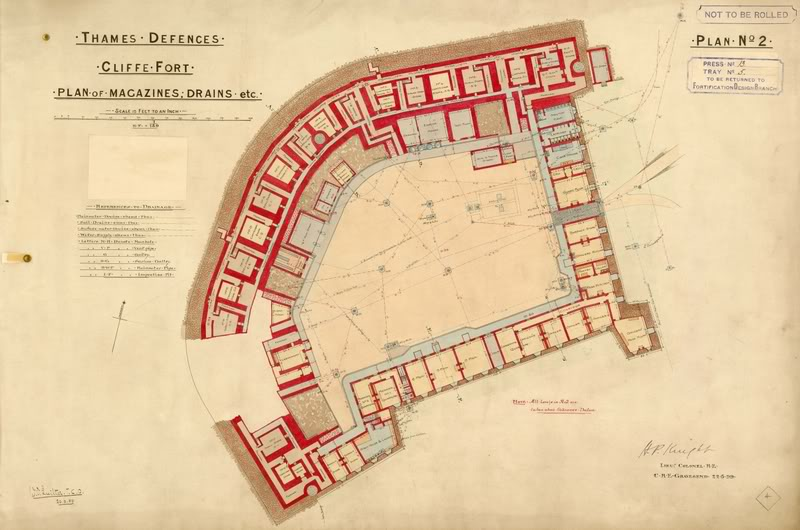
Magazine floor

The fort's main armament by 1887 consisted of two 12.5-inch and nine 11-inch RMLs mounted in casemates plus two 9-inch RMLs in open battery at the upriver end. The arc of fire of the guns was designed to cross with that of Coalhouse and Shornemead Forts. Fire control positions for optical range-finders were later added to the roof, as there was no higher ground nearby that could be used for the purpose.

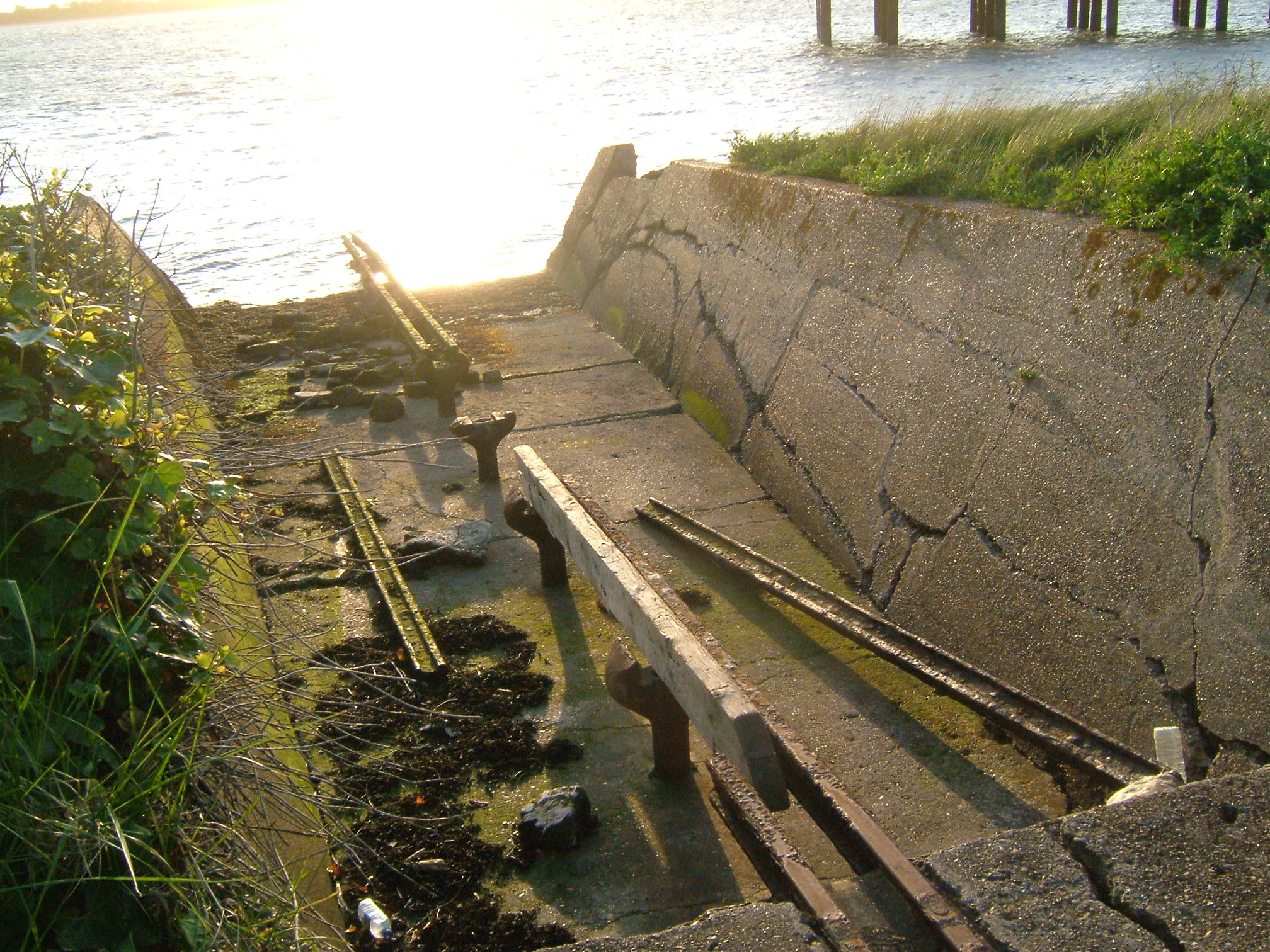
Brennan Torpedo launch slipway

Some time after 1887, a launching station for the Brennan torpedo—a weapon which has been described as "the world's first practical guided missile"—was added to the fort. One of the magazines was converted into a chamber for the engine room with ancillary chambers for other machinery. One of the emplacements in the open battery also had to be taken out of service. A large concrete room was built onto the front of the fort to store the torpedoes, which were launched from a rail mounted on the roof of the torpedo room. Flank walls were added to the roof to protect the launch crew from enemy fire. Two slipways were built at different times, the second being added most likely in the 1900s, along with a telescopic control tower on the roof to direct the torpedoes. Only one of the slipways now survives along with vestiges of the tower; the other slipway has been infilled.

After 1895, the fort was modernised with the addition of concrete emplacements on the roof to accommodate first three 3 pdr. QF guns (and subsequently four 12 pdr. quick-firing guns), in addition to the existing two 12.5-inch RMLs, five 11-inch RMLs and one 9-inch RML. The new QF guns were added to cover a planned boom defence and minefield against enemy attempts to clear them. Searchlights were also installed and the ditch was largely filled in.

In World War I the 12 pdr. guns were replaced by two 6-inch breech-loading Mk. VII guns emplaced on the fort's roof, which in turn were replaced near the end of the war by four QF guns. The torpedo station had been dismantled by this time. The fort was disarmed in 1927, but during World War II, two of the positions on the roof were altered to accommodate two 4-inch anti-aircraft guns. It was used as a base for the Royal Navy Auxiliary Service during the war.

== Current status ==
The War Office sold Cliffe Fort in the 1950s or 1960s to the owners of the large aggregates works next to the structure. Formerly owned by Blue Circle Aggregates, it is presently owned by Brett Aggregates, who operate the sea-dredged aggregate processing wharf adjacent. It was used for a while as the headquarters for the Blue Circle Sailing Club but was eventually abandoned and left to fall into disuse. It is not open to the public and is fenced off, though its exterior is accessible via the Saxon Shore Way coastal path, which runs in front of it. The fort is now derelict and in a deteriorated condition. The interior is heavily flooded and has suffered from vandalism; the domestic range has fallen into ruin. The exterior is overgrown, partly flooded and surrounded by piles of sand from the neighbouring aggregates works, though it is structurally sound. The fort is listed on the English Heritage "Heritage at Risk" register.

== Bibliography ==
- Hogg, Ian V (1974). Coast Defences of England and Wales 1856–1956. David & Charles. ISBN 0-7153 6353-0.
