= Tilbury Fort =

Fortification in England

- Tilbury, Essex
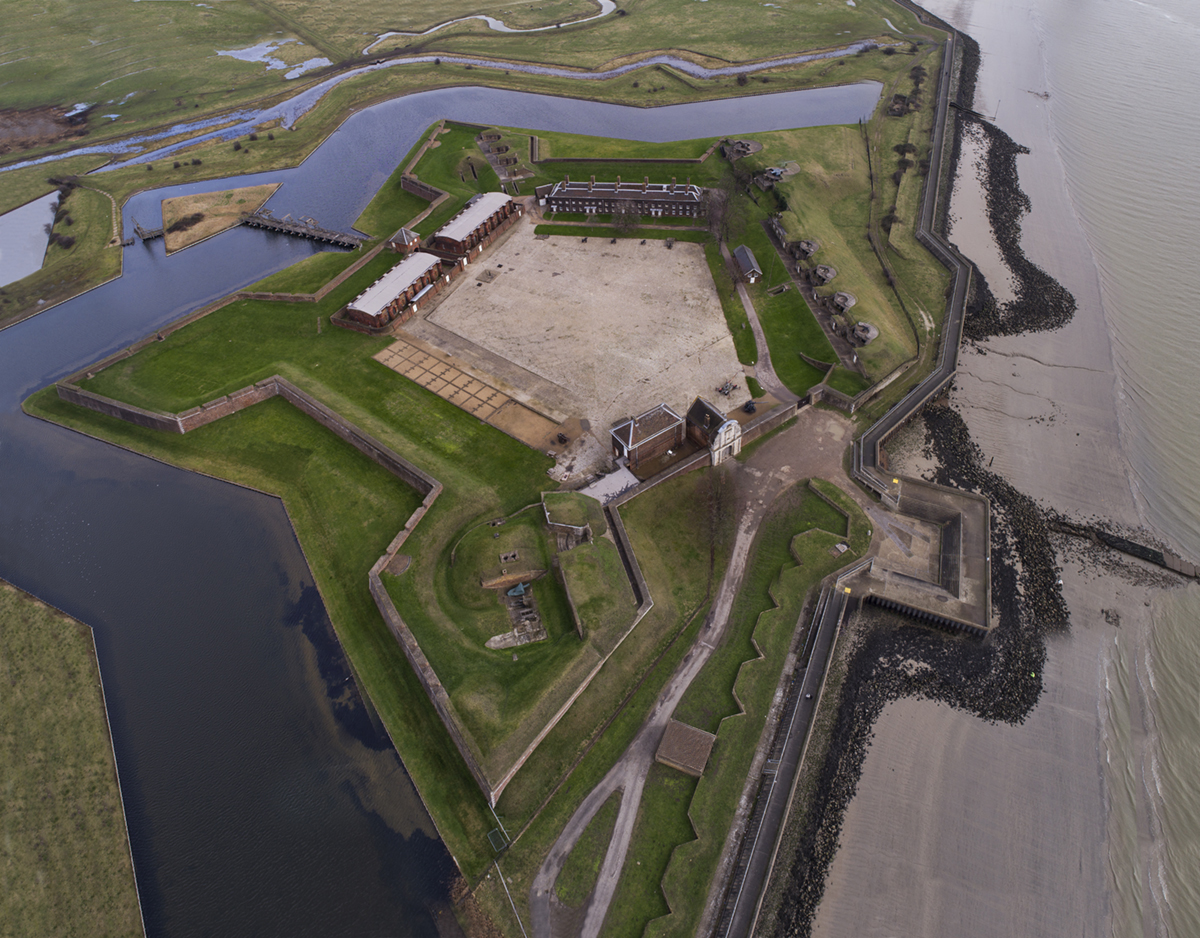
- Aerial view of Tilbury fort

Site information
- Type: Artillery fort
- Owner: English Heritage
- Open to the public: Yes
- Condition: Intact

Location
- Tilbury Fort, shown within Essex
- Coordinates: 51°27′10″N 0°22′29″E

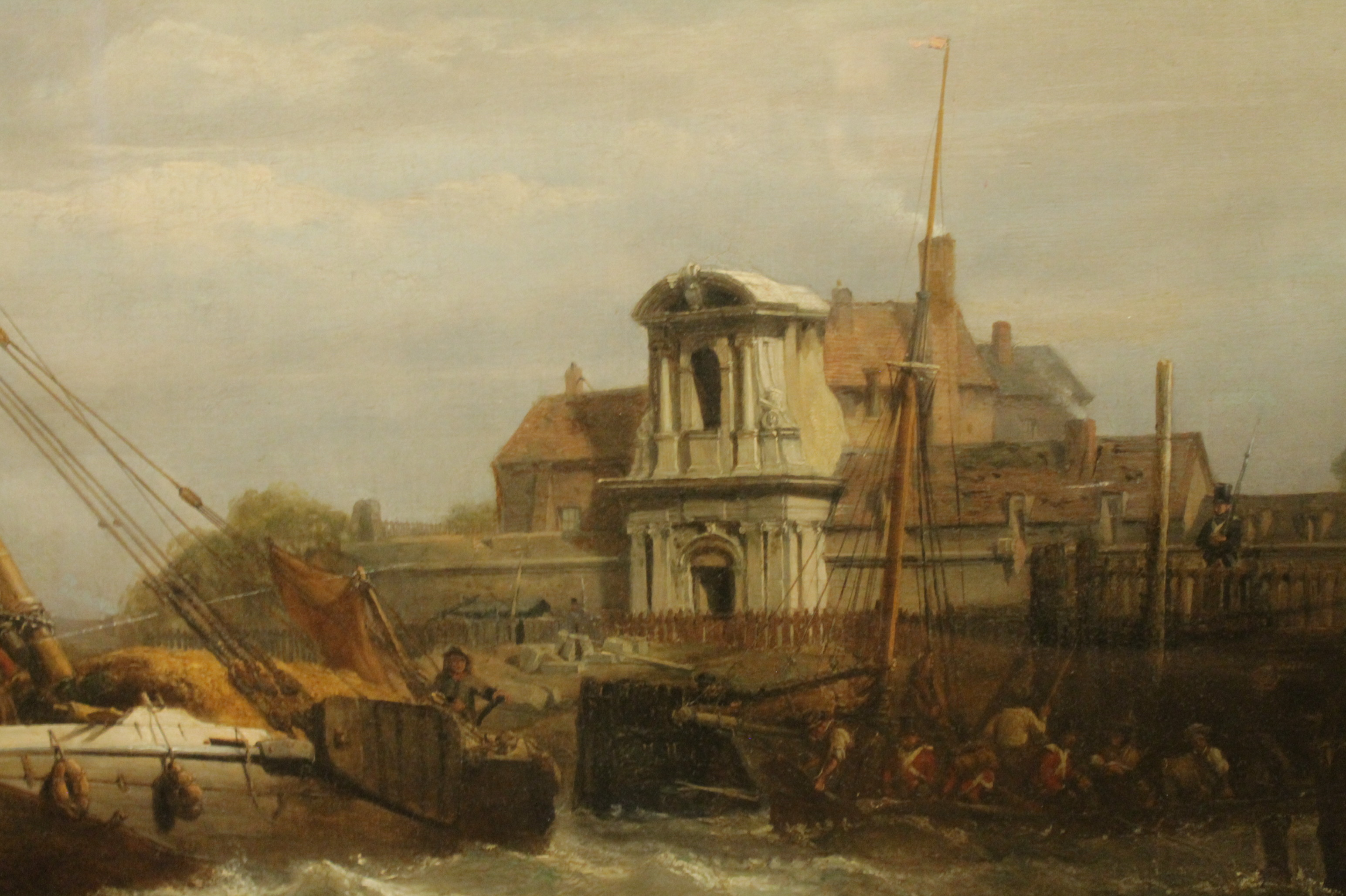
Tilbury Fort, Wind Against Tide (close up of fort) by Clarkson Stanfield 1846

Tilbury Fort, also known historically as the Thermitage Bulwark and the West Tilbury Blockhouse, is an artillery fort on the north bank of the River Thames in England. The earliest version of the fort, comprising a small blockhouse with artillery covering the river, was constructed by King Henry VIII to protect London against attack from France as part of his Device programme. It was reinforced during the 1588 Spanish Armada invasion scare, after which it was reinforced with earthwork bastion, and Parliamentary forces used it to help secure the capital during the English Civil War of the 1640s. Following naval raids during the Anglo-Dutch Wars, the fort was enlarged by Sir Bernard de Gomme from 1670 onwards to form a star-shaped defensive work, with angular bastions, water-filled moats and two lines of guns facing onto the river.

In addition to protecting the Thames, in the 18th century Tilbury also began to be used as a transit depot and for storing gunpowder. It continued to be essential for the defence of the capital and a new artillery battery was added in the south-east corner during the Napoleonic Wars. The fort became decreasingly significant as a defensive structure as military technology developed in the 19th century. It was redeveloped to hold heavy artillery after 1868, providing a second line of defence along the river, but further changes in technology meant that it had become obsolete by the end of the century. Instead Tilbury became a strategic depot, forming a logistical hub for storing and moving troops and materiel throughout the First World War. The fort had only a limited role in the Second World War and was demobilised in 1950.

Tilbury Fort is now operated by the charity English Heritage Trust as a tourist attraction, receiving 16,154 visitors in 2014. Many of the more modern military features were demolished during the 1950s, with further restoration work taking place during the 1970s ahead of the site opening to the public in 1983. The 17th-century defences are considered by the historian Paul Pattison to be the "best surviving example of their kind in Britain", and the fort includes the only surviving early 18th century gunpowder magazines in Britain.

== History ==
=== 16th century ===
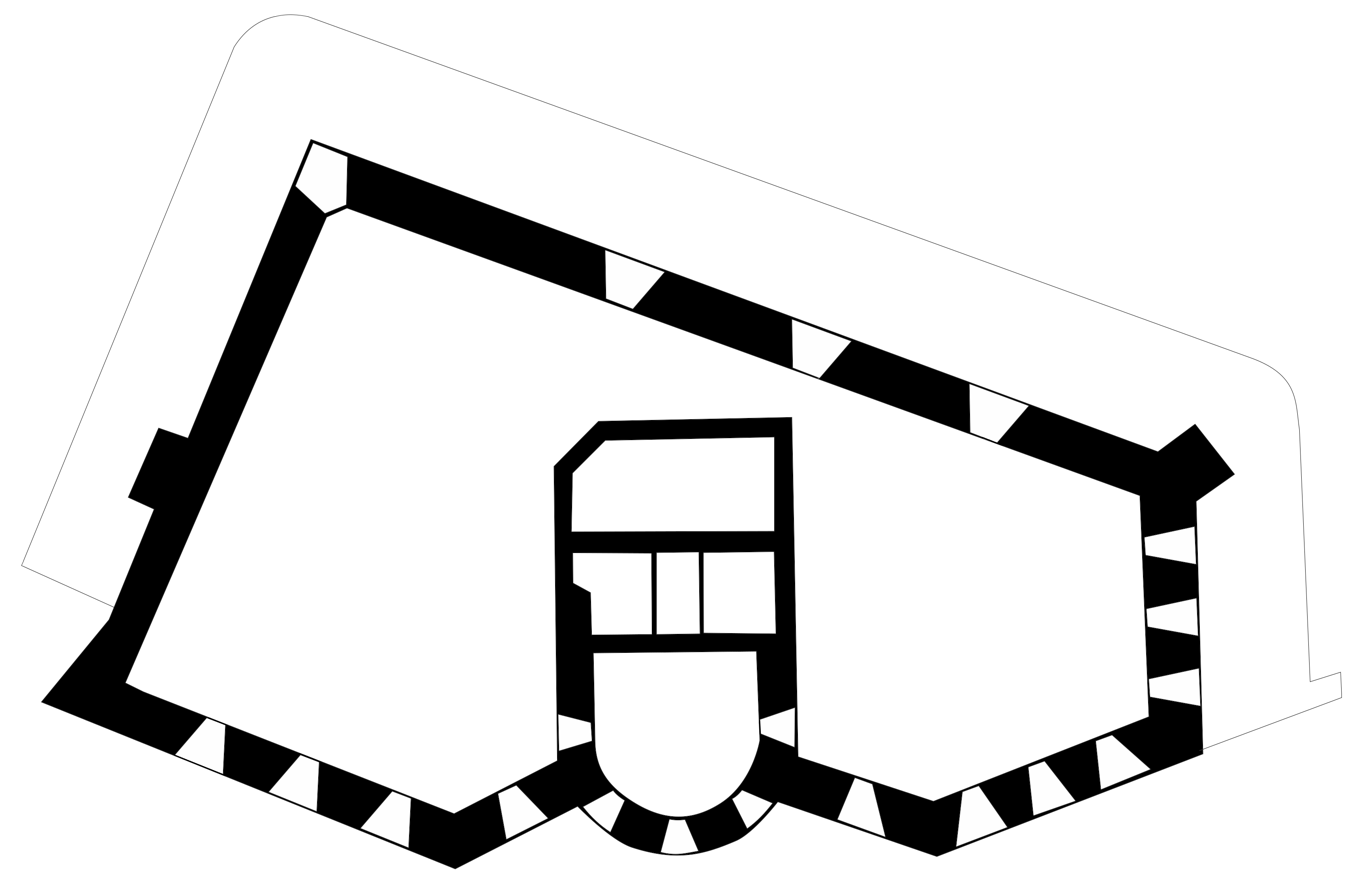
Plan of the early Tudor blockhouse

The first permanent fortification at Tilbury in Essex was built as a consequence of international tensions between England, France and the Holy Roman Empire in the final years of the reign of King Henry VIII. Traditionally the Crown had left coastal defences to the local lords and communities, only taking a modest role in building and maintaining fortifications, and while France and the Empire remained in conflict with one another, maritime raids were common but an actual invasion of England seemed unlikely. Basic defences, based around simple blockhouses and towers, existed in the south-west and along the Sussex coast, with a few more impressive works in the north of England, but in general the fortifications were very limited in scale.

In 1533, Henry broke with Pope Paul III in order to annul the long-standing marriage to his wife, Catherine of Aragon, and remarry. Catherine was the aunt of Charles V, the Holy Roman Emperor, and he took the annulment as a personal insult. This resulted in France and the Empire declaring an alliance against Henry in 1538, and the Pope encouraging the two countries to attack England. An invasion of England appeared certain. In response, Henry issued an order, called a "device", in 1539, giving instructions for the "defence of the realm in time of invasion" and the construction of forts along the English coastline.

The River Thames was strategically important, as the city of London and the newly constructed royal dockyards of Deptford and Woolwich were vulnerable to seaborne attacks arriving up the estuary, which was a major maritime route, carrying 80 per cent of England's exports. At the mouth of the estuary, the Thames narrowed considerably, forming a natural hub for communications: the "Long Ferry" took passengers into the capital, and the "Cross Ferry" moved traffic across the river. This was also the first point that an invasion force would be able to easily disembark along the Thames, as before this point the mudflats along the sides of the estuary would have made landings difficult. Temporary defences had been constructed at Tilbury as early as the 14th and 15th centuries, although little is known about their design.

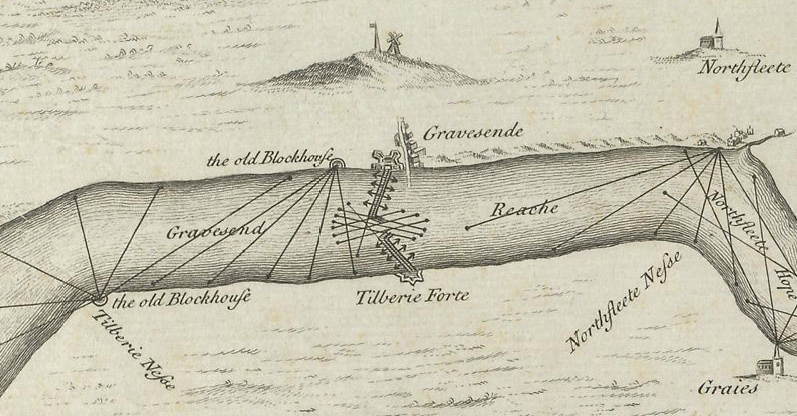
19th-century copy of 1588 engraving, showing the defences along the River Thames, including Tilbury Fort (centre) and the boom

Under the King's new programme of work, the Thames was protected with a mutually reinforcing network of blockhouses at Gravesend, Milton, and Higham on the south side of the river, and West and East Tilbury on the opposite bank. West Tilbury Blockhouse, part of the inner line, was initially called the "Thermitage Bulwark", because it was on the site of a hermitage dissolved by the King in 1536. It was designed by James Nedeham and Christopher Morice, supported by three overseers; prior to the work, the estimated cost had been given as £211, allowing for stone, timber, 150,000 bricks and 200 tonnes (200 long tons; 220 short tons) of chalk. (Note: Comparing early modern costs and prices with those of the modern period is challenging. £211 in 1539 could equate to between £118,900 and £54,140,000, depending on the price comparison used. For comparison, the total royal expenditure on all the Device Forts across England between 1539–47 came to £376,500, with St Mawes, for example, costing £5,018, and Sandgate £5,584. £305 in 1588 could equate to between £921,000 and £26 million, and £47,000 in 1670 to between £92 million and £1,500 million.) The D-shaped blockhouse was curved at the front, with two storeys of gun-ports, and probably had additional gun platforms stretching along the river on either side of it; ancillary buildings were placed at the rear and the whole site was protected by a rampart and a ditch, with extensive marshlands and creeks giving additional protection to the east. It was initially commanded by Captain Francis Grant and his deputy, and garrisoned with a porter, two soldiers and four gunners, equipped with up to five artillery pieces including a demi-cannon and sakers.

The invasion threat passed and in 1553 all of the blockhouses were ordered to return their guns; Milton and Higham were demolished. In the summer of 1588, however, there was a fresh threat of invasion by the Spanish Armada. An army was mobilised to protect the mouth of the estuary and emergency improvements to the fortifications at Tilbury Blockhouse were made by Robert Dudley, the Earl of Leicester. Queen Elizabeth I visited the fort by barge on 8 August 1588 and rode in procession to the nearby army camp, where she gave a speech to the assembled forces. Fears of invasion continued even after the defeat of the Armada, and over the course of the next year the Italian engineer, Federigo Giambelli, reinforced the blockhouse with probably two concentric earthwork ramparts, with ditches and a palisade. A boom was stretched across the river to Gravesend at a cost of £305.

=== 17th century ===
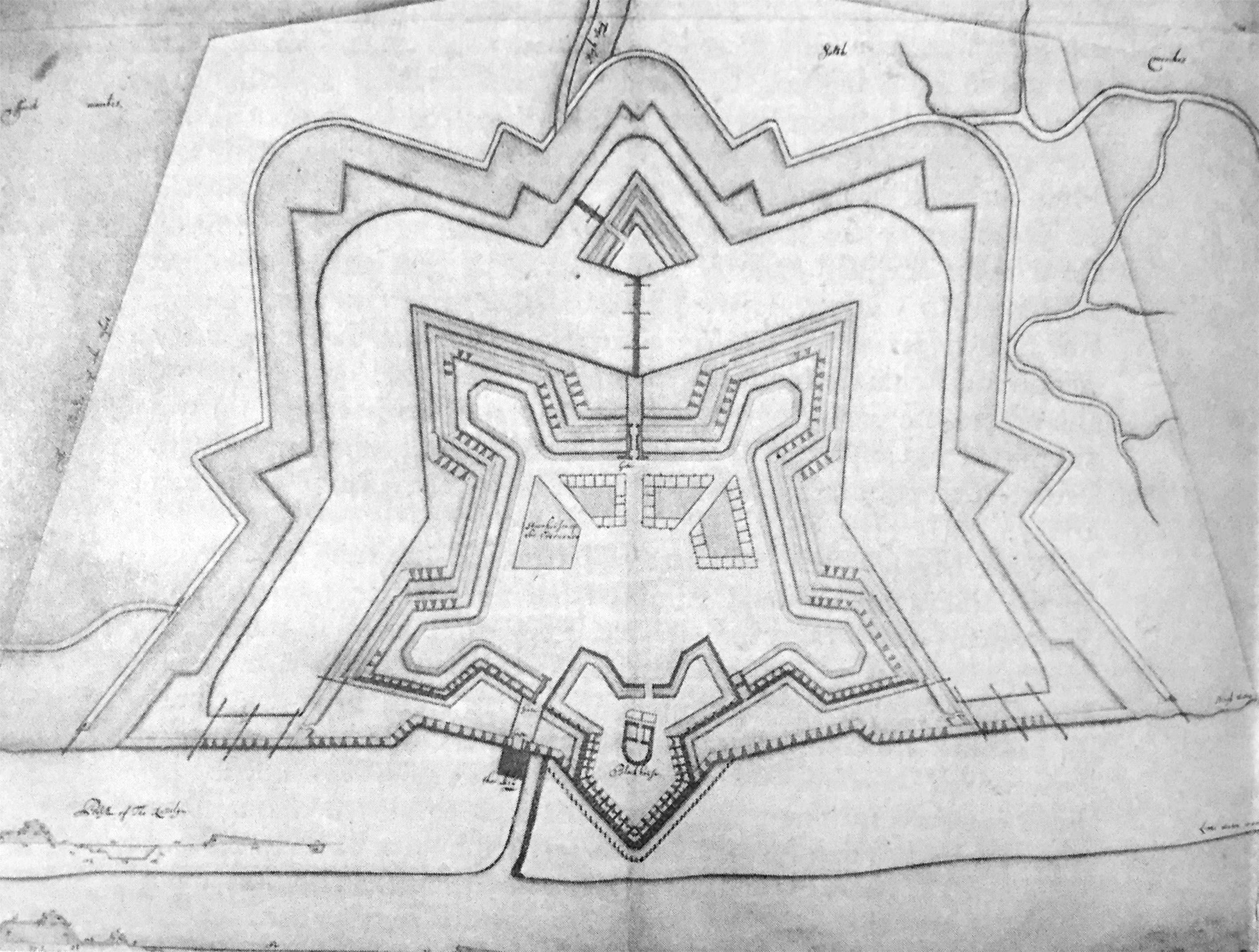
Bernard de Gomme's original plan for the redesigned fort, 1670

In the early 1600s, England was at peace with France and Spain and as a result the coastal defences received little attention; surveys reported multiple problems with Tilbury Fort including flooding caused by the estuary tides, and ferry passengers and animals making their way uninvited into the fort. In 1642 civil war broke out between the supporters of King Charles I and those of Parliament. Tilbury was controlled by Parliament, who placed the Tilbury and Gravesend forts under the command of a military governor, using them to control traffic entering London and to search for spies; it saw no military action during the war. Tilbury remained in use during the interregnum, having a garrison of three officers and sixty-six men in 1651.

After Charles II was restored to the throne in 1660, he began a wide-ranging programme of work on the coastal defences. The Dutch fleet then attacked up the Thames in June 1667, but were deterred from going further for fear of the Tilbury and Gravesend fortifications. In reality, the forts were poorly prepared to resist a Dutch attack; at Tilbury there were only two guns ready for action. The Dutch struck the English fleet at Medway instead, giving enough time for the government to improve the defences along the Thames and mount 80 guns on the forts. In the wake of the conflict, the King instructed his Chief Engineer, a Dutchman called Sir Bernard de Gomme, to develop Tilbury Fort's defences further.

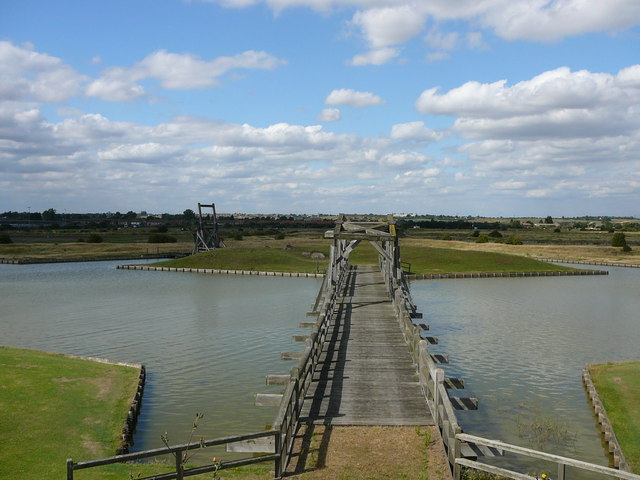
The 17th-century ravelin, drawbridges and the inner moat

De Gomme prepared several plans for the King in 1665; a further iteration of the designs was submitted in 1670 and given royal approval. Work began the same year but it took until 1685 to complete the project. The work was carried out by skilled contractors, who were supplemented by large teams of pressed men brought in from across the region; during 1671, up to 256 workers were employed on the site. Around 3,000 timber piles had to be brought from Norway for the project in 1671 to support the foundations in the marshy ground. The resources needed for the King's multiple defence projects became stretched, and one of the planned bastions at Tilbury, originally planned to face the river, was cancelled in 1681, in part to save money. The total cost of the project is unknown, but was significantly more than the original estimate of £47,000.

The result was a large, five-sided, star-shaped fort with four angular bastions, revetted in brick, with an outer curtain of defences, including two moats and a redoubt; two new gatehouses defended the entrance from the north. Two gun lines of gun platforms, facing the river, stretched alongside either the side of the fort. The Henrician blockhouse was incorporated into the defences, but the Elizabethan earthworks were destroyed. The interior of the fort was raised up above the level of the marshes to prevent flooding, and barracks and other buildings were constructed inside. The writer John Evelyn praised the new fort as "a Royal work indeede". Further work after 1694 replaced the wooden gun platforms alongside the river with more durable stone equivalents.

=== 18th–19th centuries ===
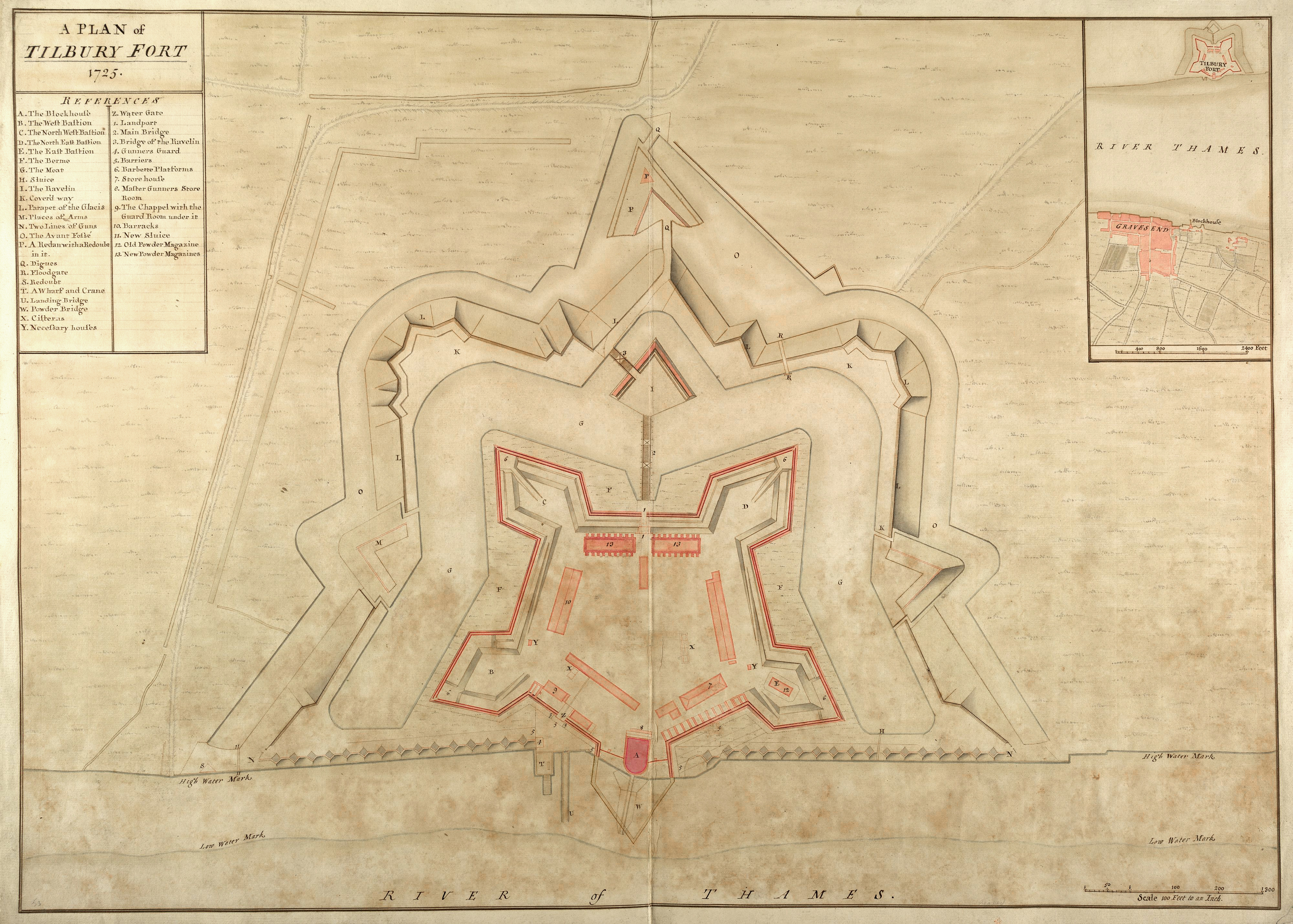
Plan of the fort in 1725; the Tudor blockhouse is still in place, bottom centre.

By the start of the 18th century, Tilbury Fort was one of the most powerful in Britain. The number of artillery guns varied; in 1715 there were 17 demi-cannon and 26 culverins mounted on the west gun platform, and 31 demi-cannons and one culverin on the east; the following year there were reported to be 161 guns in total at the fort, although 92 of these were in poor repair and inoperable.

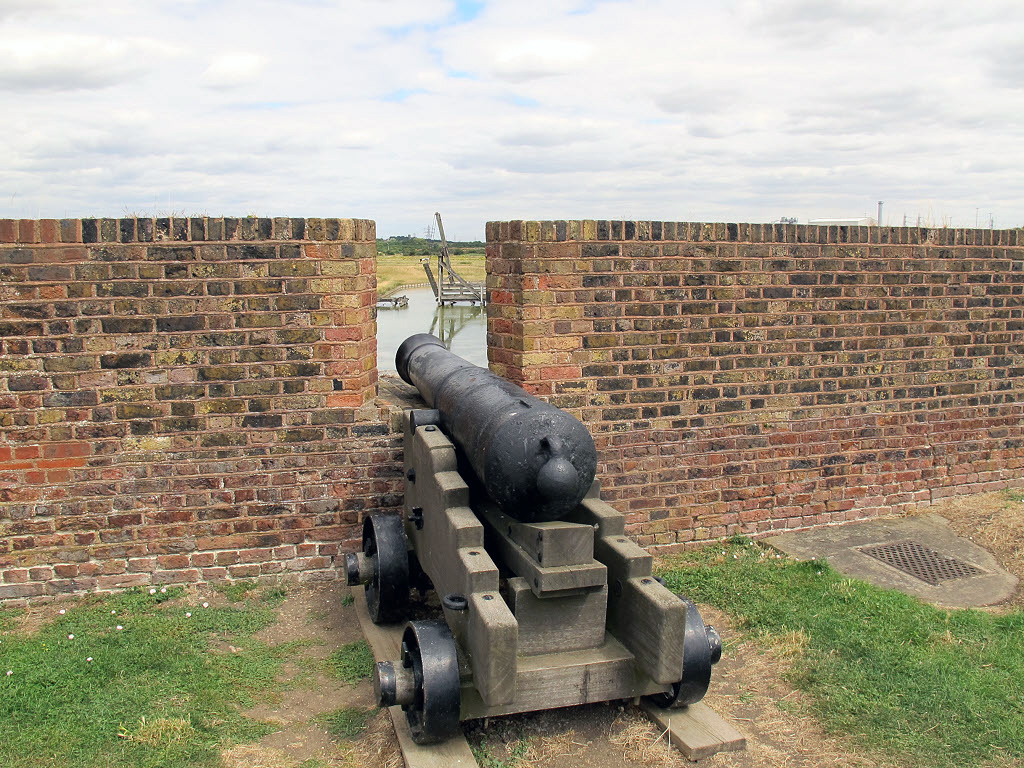
Late 18th-century cannon on the bastion walls

In addition to its role in protecting the Thames, the fort had various military uses during the 18th century. From 1716 onwards, the Board of Ordnance began to use it as a gunpowder depot; there were safety restrictions on moving gunpowder in and out of the London docks, so Tilbury was used instead. Two large magazines were built, able to hold 3,600 barrels of powder each, and the old blockhouse and other buildings were converted to act as further magazines. Eventually the fort could hold more than 19,000 barrels of gunpowder. It was also used as a transit depot for soldiers and, after the Jacobite rising of 1745, as a prison to hold 268 Highlander prisoners of war. The Jacobite prisoners were kept in the gunpowder magazines and 45 died from typhus before they were sent on to London for trial.

The living conditions at the fort were poor. It was surrounded by marshes, with a poor road network, and the garrison had to survive on collected rainwater, in addition to water from a spring. Malaria was a problem; in 1873, of 103 soldiers at the fort, 34 were admitted to hospital with it. The Army Medical Report for 1874 said that "Tilbury Fort has long been regarded as unhealthy, and the troops as of late years have been removed every six months".

A trader called a sutler built a house inside the southern entrance, growing vegetables within the south-west bastion and enjoying an effective monopoly on selling food to the soldiers. New barracks for the officers and enlisted men were rebuilt in 1772, but the officers often preferred to live across the river in the more urban setting of Gravesend, near the military headquarters there. A cricket match in 1776 between men from the Kentish and Essex sides of the Thames reportedly ended in bloodshed when guns were seized from the guardroom; newspapers recounted how an Essex man and a sergeant were shot dead, and a soldier was bayonetted, before both sides fled the scene. It is uncertain how accurate the newspaper account was, although the historians Andrew Saunders and Charles Kightly give it some credence.

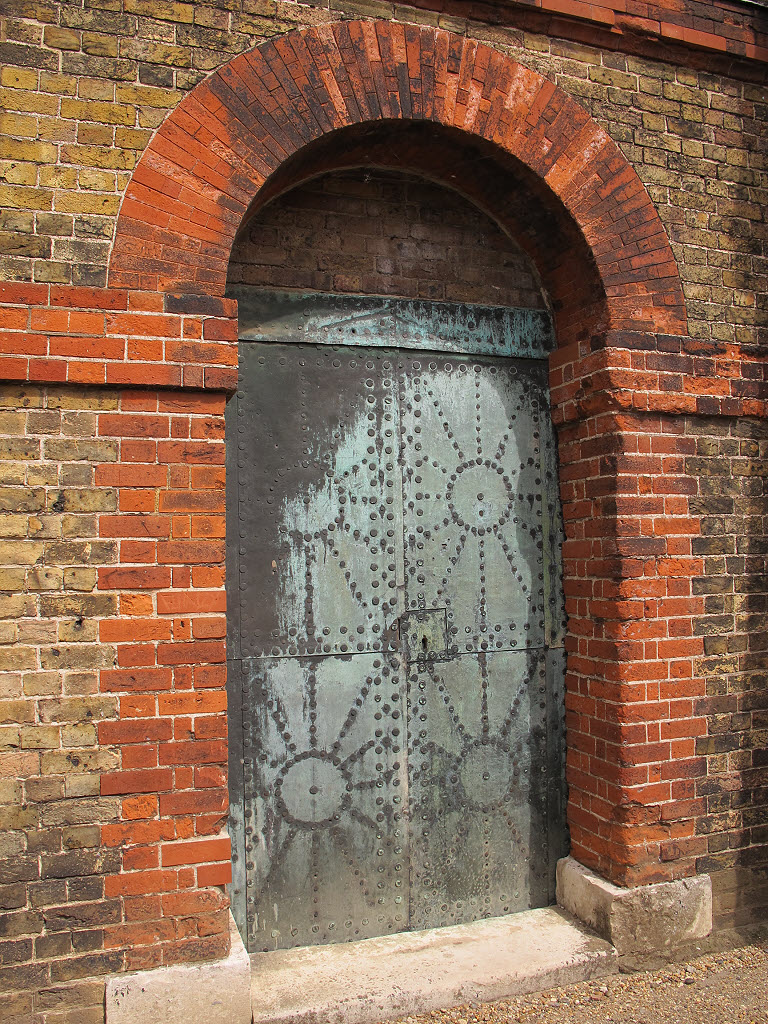
Early 18th-century copper doors on the magazines

During the American Revolutionary War there were fears of a French attack on London. In 1780, the Army carried out a practice attack on the fort with 5,000 soldiers, but there were less than 60 guns left at the fort and many of these were in poor condition. Thomas Hyde Page inspected Tilbury in 1788 and reported that the defences facing the Thames were seriously inadequate. As a consequence, a new battery was built in the south-east corner of the defences, armed with 32-pounders (14.5 kg) pointing down-river, and a new battery, New Tavern Fort, was built along the river to the east. Fears continued during the French Revolutionary and Napoleonic Wars and smaller batteries were constructed further up the river in 1794. Tilbury continued to be an essential part of the capital's defences because of its control of the crossing point on the Thames, and the guns were upgraded with new traversing platforms; the Gravesend Volunteer Artillery was formed to man the forts on both sides of the river. During the invasion scare of 1803, the Royal Trinity House Volunteer Artillery manned ten armed hulks placed across the river as a barrier at Tilbury.

The size of the garrison varied during the first half of the century, but in 1830 the fort had space for 15 officers and 150 enlisted men. Despite the construction of a new range of facilities in 1809, the living conditions of the soldiers remained poor, with four men sharing each of the two-bed rooms in the barracks, and no running water on the site. During the 19th century, a pump was installed to bring water up from a well 178 metres (584 ft) below the surface. Nationwide investigations into the standard of Army barracks during 1857 led to investment in better facilities at Tilbury; piped water was run into the site in 1877, and improved amenities and sanitation were installed after 1880.

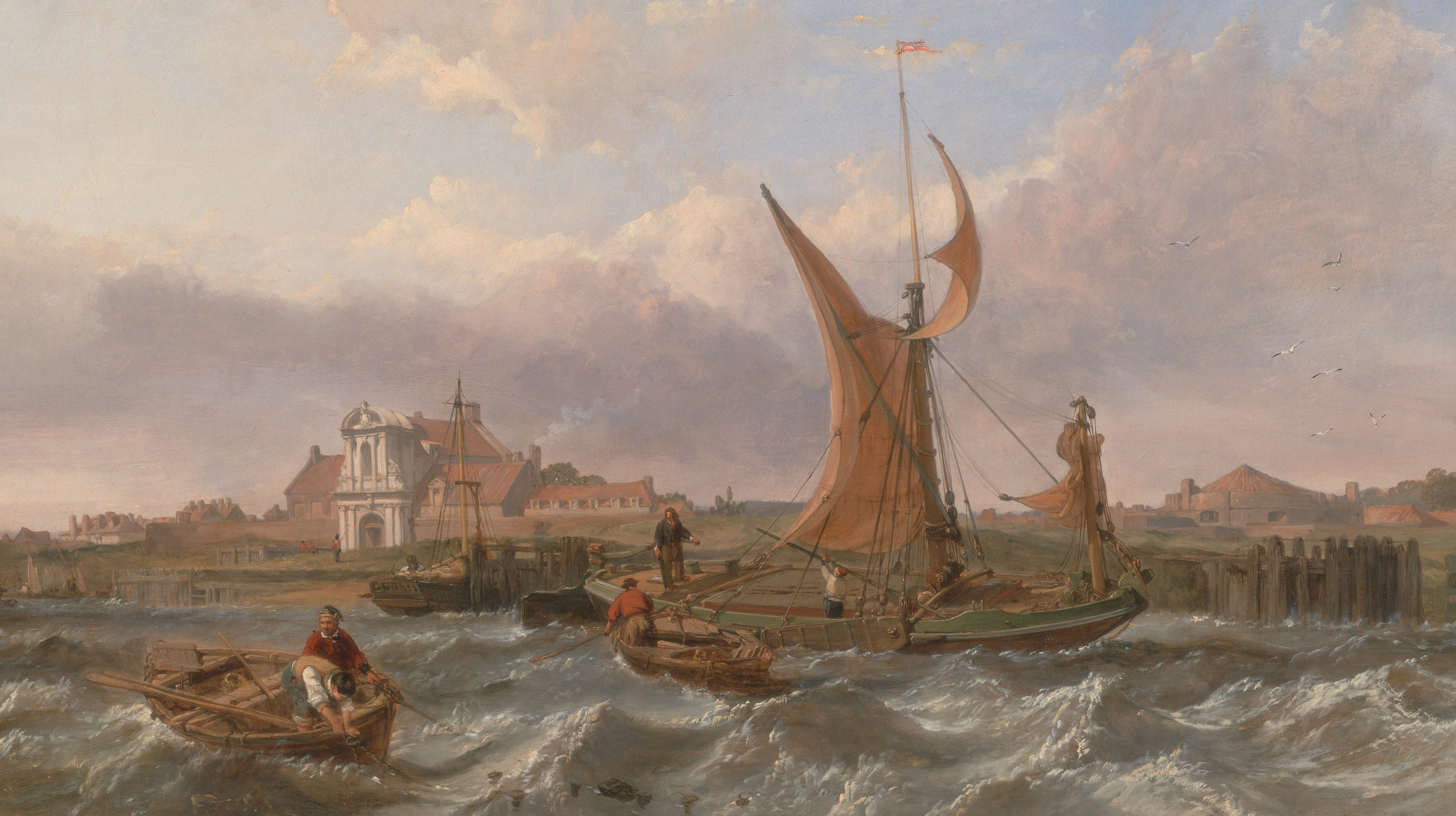
Tilbury Fort- Wind Against Tide by Clarkson Stanfield, showing Tilbury Fort (left) and Coalhouse Fort (right) in 1853

By the 1850s, the advent of steam ships meant that enemy vessels could sail up the Thames far more quickly than before, reducing the time available for forts to intercept them. Rifled guns and turret-mounted weapons and new armour-plating meant that enemy warships could fire on forts such as Tilbury from downstream more easily while being protected from their guns. Fears of a potential invasion by Napoleon III of France led to the establishment Royal Commission on the Defence of the United Kingdom in 1859. The Commission reported the following year and recommended that new, more powerful forts be built further downstream, with defences such as Tilbury Fort forming a second-line of defence. Work began on strengthening Tilbury in 1868, under the direction of the then Captain Charles Gordon, focusing on adding heavier gun positions able to fire upstream to support the new forts. The west, north-east and east bastions and the south-east curtain wall were altered to house thirteen rifled muzzle-loading guns, protected by brick walls, earthworks and iron shields. Initially 7-ton, 7-inch (7,112 kg, 17 cm) guns were deployed but these were upgraded to 9-inch (22 cm) weapons by 1888, supported by a heavier 25-ton, 11-inch (25,401 kg, 27 cm) gun. The old Tudor block-house was destroyed to make way for the new guns.

Naval and defensive technology continued to improve over the next few decades, rendering Tilbury Fort's bastion design out-moded. The government considered the defences further down the Thames to be sufficient and Tilbury was therefore not improved; it was largely redundant as a defensive fortification by the end of the century, although still in use as a strategic depot. From 1889 onwards it formed a mobilisation centre to support a mobile strike force in the event of an invasion, part of the wider London Defence Scheme, and large storage buildings were built across the site to store materiel.

=== 20th–21st centuries ===
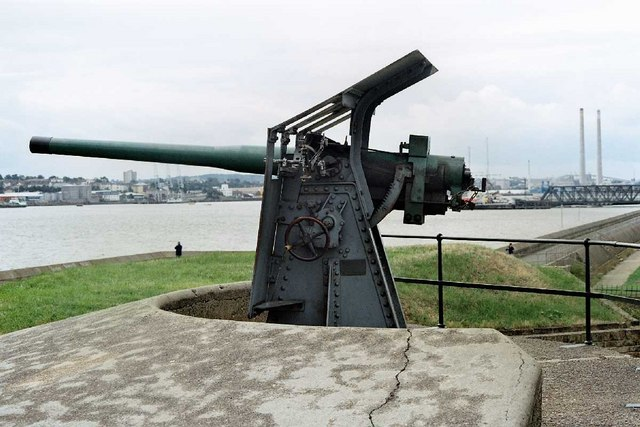
A Mark V quick-firing 12-pounder, 12 cwt (5.4 kg, 50.8 kg) gun on the south-eastern curtain

Fresh concerns grew that the Thames might be vulnerable to attack from torpedo boats and armoured cruisers, and in 1903 four quick-firing 12-pounder, 12 cwt (5.4 kg, 50.8 kg) guns were positioned on Tilbury's south-east curtain wall, supplemented in 1904 by two 6-inch (15 cm) breech loading guns. In 1905, however, the government decided that the Royal Navy and the forts downstream gave sufficient protection for the capital and removed the artillery, leaving only machine-guns in place.

Tilbury continued to function as a mobilisation store and, after the outbreak of the First World War, it was used to house up to 300 transit soldiers and to supply the new army camps established at Purfleet and Belhus Mansion. It was initially manned by the 2nd Battalion of the Royal Dublin Fusiliers until 1916, and by various reserve units for the rest of the war. The fort itself was used to store munitions while a depot for remounts was built just to the west; a pontoon bridge was built across the Thames for troop movements, guarded by the fort's guns. Until 1917, also used to house the headquarters of several infantry battalions. Electric lighting was installed, and a narrow-gauge railway and a steam crane on the quay were added to help to move material in and out of the fort. After the Zeppelin raids of June 1915, anti-aircraft guns and searchlights mounted at the fort and they played a role in the shooting down of the German Navy Zeppelin, L15, although it is disputed as to which site in the area fired the shell that brought down the airship.

During the inter-war years, the government concluded that the fort was no longer militarily useful and there were unsuccessful attempts to sell it off for development. During the Second World War, the fort initially housed an improvised anti-aircraft operations room, controlling the defences of the Thames and Medway (North) Gun Zone between 1939 and 1940. Trenches were dug across the surrounding area to prevent an airborne attack. The enlisted barracks and the facilities block, as well as probably the sutler's house, were bombed and damaged, being demolished after the war. The fort was transferred out of military use relatively early in the post-war period, and in 1950 the Ministry of Works took over the site. Restoration work took place in the 1970, including the construction of replica wooden bridges. It was opened to the public in 1982.

In the 21st century, the fort is controlled by English Heritage and operated as a tourist attraction, receiving 16,154 visitors in 2014. The site was designated as a scheduled monument on 18th January 1973, giving it protection under UK law. The officers' barracks is a grade II* listed building in its own right.

== Architecture ==
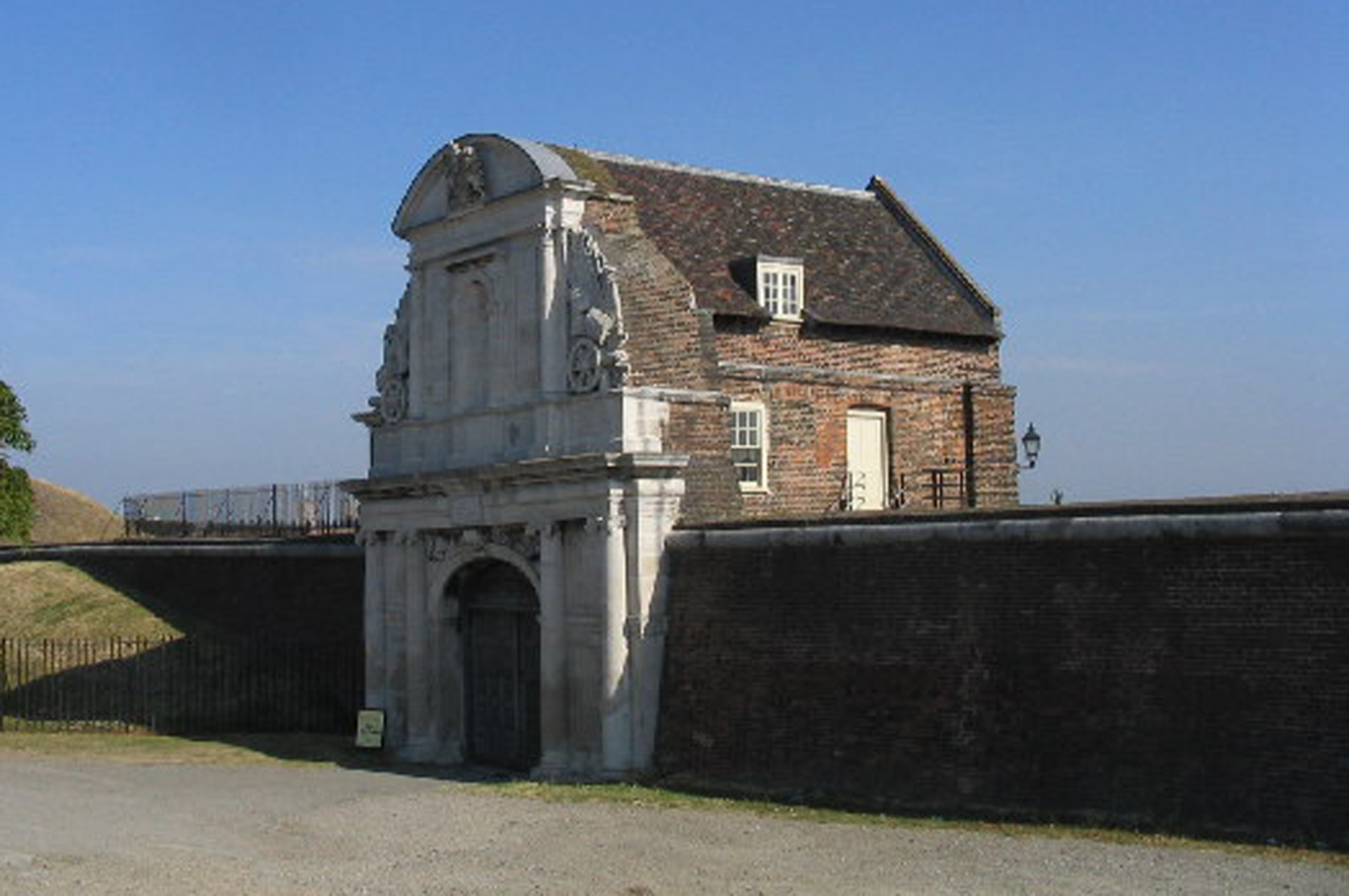
The Water Gate (1676-1683)

Tilbury Fort remains largely unaltered from its reconstruction in the late 17th century under the direction of Sir Bernard de Gomme, with some 19th century additions. It was designed in a predominantly Dutch style, with a ring of outer and inner defences intended to allow the fort to attack hostile warships, while being protected from attack from the land. The heritage agency Historic England describes it as "England's most spectacular" example of a late 17th-century fort, and the historian Paul Pattison considers the defences the "best surviving example of their kind in Britain".

=== Outer defences ===
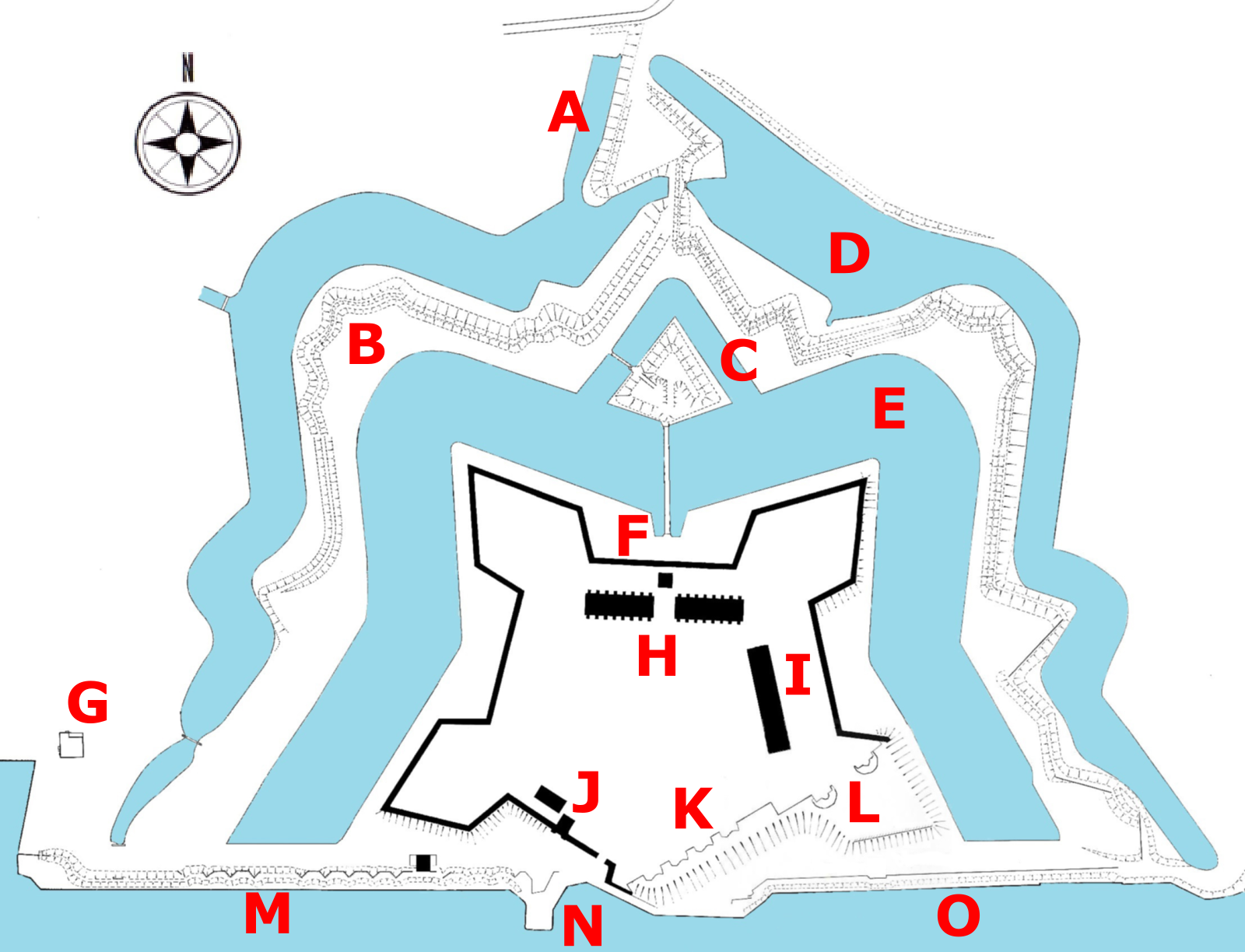
Plan of the fort; A – redan; B – outer defences and covered way; C – ravelin; D – outer moat; E – inner moat; F – Landport Gate; G – The World's End public house; H – magazines; I – officer's quarters; J – Water Gate, chapel and guard House; K – quick-firing emplacements; L – 6-inch (15 cm) gun emplacements; M – West Gun Line; N – quay; O – East Gun Line

The outer defences comprise outer and inner water-filled moats, fed by the Thames and separated by a ring of defensive ramparts. The inner moat is 50 metres (160 ft) wide but relatively shallow and the banks have been repeatedly strengthened with piles to protect them from erosion. The fort is entered from the north through a triangular defensive work known as a redan, with a redoubt to defend the entrance. A causeway links the redan to the outer defences, which form a complex pattern of ramparts, protecting a covered way stretching around the defensive line. There are bastions on the north-west and north-east corners, and two triangular spurs, originally equipped with cannons, project from the defences on the west and east sides, with assembly points for infantry soldiers on the inside.

A replica wooden bridge runs from the outer defences over the water to an island called a ravelin, which is in turn linked to the inner defences by another replica bridge, protected with two drawbridges. The ravelin formed a physical barrier to incoming artillery fire aimed at the entrance to the inner defences and could also have directed fire against enemy forces that breached the outer defensive line.

On the south side of the outer defences, facing the river, are the West and East Lines of gun positions. These were built in the 18th century and have been subject to considerable erosion and silting; 12 of the original 14 gun positions on the West Line remain but only one of the East Line has survived. In between the lines is a quay, designed to allow the delivery of supplies from the Thames, and the remains of the tracks from the narrow gauge railway built during the First World War. A sluice gate in the south-west corner managed the water in the moats, and allowed them to be drained completely should the surfaces begin to freeze over in winter and provide an advantage to any attackers. To the west of the outer defences is the World's End pub, originally the local ferry house, dating from 1788.

=== Inner defences ===
The inner defences largely follow a pentagonal design, with four defensive bastions positioned around a central parade ground. From the south, the fort is entered through the Water Gate. This two-storeyed gatehouse dates from the late 17th century with a monumental stone facade featuring carved displays of classical and 17th-century weapons; when first built, the now-empty niche at the front probably held a statue of King Charles II. The building originally acted a house for the master gunner. Most of the inside of the fort is taken up by the parade ground, an area covering 2.5 acres (1.0 ha). The central parade ground was raised to its current height in the 17th and 19th centuries using chalk and dirt, and by the early 20th century much of it was occupied by four large warehouses, since destroyed.

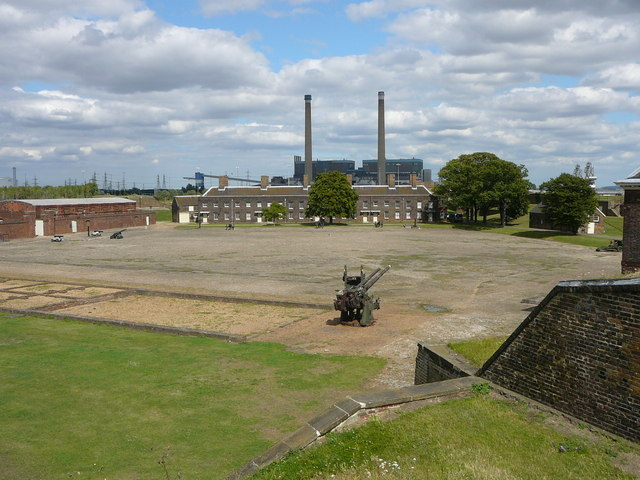
The parade ground, with the foundations of the soldiers' barracks in the foreground

Moving east from the Water Gate, the south-eastern curtain defences and the south-east bastion were rebuilt at the start of the 20th century to hold emplacements for four quick-firing guns and two 6-inch (15 cm) guns, with tunnels linking to an underground magazine. Four artillery pieces, dating from 1898 to 1942, are on display. Facing the parade ground are the officers' quarters, a terrace of houses probably dating in its current form to the late 18th century, with a stables at the northern end, originally used to hold the commandant's horses. It now holds the Bernard Truss collection of military memorabilia. The north-east bastion was redesigned after 1868 and contains an earth-covered magazine, as well as emplacements for 9-inch (22 cm) rifled muzzle loading guns.

On the north side of the parade are two early 18th century magazines, altered in the 19th century. These were specially designed to avoid the use of iron, which might have generated sparks and set off an explosion, instead being built using wood and copper; they are the only remaining examples of their type in Britain. The Landport Gate lies behind the magazines, and has a gatehouse, called the Dead House, above the passageway leading into the interior of the fort. Past the north-west bastion, the soldiers' barracks would have stood opposite those of the officers', but was destroyed after the war and only the foundations of the building remain. The south-west magazine also holds a covered magazine, similar to that in the north-east bastion. Just to the west of the Water Gate is the fort's guardhouse and chapel, dating from the late 17th century and one of the oldest surviving places of worship within a British artillery fortress.

== Bibliography ==
- Biddle, Martin; Hiller, Jonathon; Scott, Ian; Streeten, Anthony (2001). Henry VIII's Coastal Artillery Fort at Camber Castle, Rye, East Sussex: An Archaeological Structural and Historical Investigation. Oxford, UK: Oxbow Books. ISBN 0904220230.
- Chapple, Nick (2014). "A History of the National Collection: Volume Six, 1945–1953". Research Report Series. London, UK: English Heritage. ISSN 2046-9799.
- Cruden, Robert Peirce (1843). The History of the Town of Gravesend. London, UK: William Pickering. OCLC 4773453.
- Fegan, Thomas (2002). 'The Baby Killers': German Air Raids on Britain in the First World War. Barnsley, UK: Pen & Sword Military. ISBN 978-1781592038.
- Hale, J. R. (1983). Renaissance War Studies. London, UK: Hambledon Press. ISBN 0907628176.
- Harrington, Peter (2007). The Castles of Henry VIII. Oxford, UK: Osprey Publishing. ISBN 9781472803801.
- Kent Council (2004). Gravesend – Kent, Archaeological Assessment Document. Maidstone, UK: Kent Council and English Heritage.
- King, D. J. Cathcart (1991). The Castle in England and Wales: An Interpretative History. London, UK: Routledge Press. ISBN 9780415003506.
- Moore, Peter (1990). Tilbury Fort: A Post-Medieval Fort and its Inhabitants (PDF). London, UK: Newham Museum Service.
- Morley, B. M. (1976). Henry VIII and the Development of Coastal Defence. London, UK: Her Majesty's Stationery Office. ISBN 0116707771.
- Osborne, Mike (2013). Defending Essex: The Military Landscape from Prehistory to the Present. Stroud, UK: The History Press. ISBN 9780752488349.
- Pattison, Paul (2004). Tilbury Fort. London, UK: English Heritage. ISBN 9781850748663.
- Saunders, Andrew D. (1960). "Tilbury Fort and the Development of Artillery Fortifications in the Thames Estuary". The Antiquaries Journal. 40 (3–4): 152–174. doi:10.1017/s0003581500061928. S2CID 129086005.
- Saunders, Andrew D. (1977). Tilbury Fort: Essex (Amended ed.). London, UK: Her Majesty's Stationery Office. ISBN 0-1167-0311-3. Original 1960 edition available online.
- Saunders, Andrew D. (1989). Fortress Britain: Artillery Fortifications in the British Isles and Ireland. Liphook, UK: Beaufort. ISBN 1855120003.
- Smith, Victor T. C. (1974). "The Artillery Defences at Gravesend". Archaeologia Cantiana. 89: 141–168.
- Smith, Victor (1980). "The Milton Blockhouse, Gravesend: Research and Excavation". Archaeologia Cantiana. 96: 341–362.
- Thompson, M. W. (1987). The Decline of the Castle. Cambridge, UK: Cambridge University Press. ISBN 1854226088.
- Walton, Steven A. (2010). "State Building Through Building for the State: Foreign and Domestic Expertise in Tudor Fortification". Osiris. 25 (1): 66–84. doi:10.1086/657263. S2CID 144384757.
