= Quentin Hughes (architect) =

British architect (1920–2004)

James Quentin Hughes, OBE, MC & Bar (28 February 1920 – 8 May 2004) was an architect and academic. He was a British SAS officer during the Second World War, and was influential in the preservation of Liverpool's Victorian and Edwardian architectural heritage.

== Early life ==
James Quentin Hughes was born in Newsham Park, Liverpool on 28 February 1920. He was educated at Rydal School in Colwyn Bay, Wales, and then began his studies at the University of Liverpool School of Architecture in 1937.

== Second World War ==
On the outbreak of war Hughes volunteered for the Royal Artillery and was posted to 208 Anti-Aircraft Training Regiment before obtaining his commission in 1940. Hughes was posted to Malta with 48/71 D Battery RA, from which his lifelong love of the island and interest in its architecture began.

Following the Siege of Malta, in 1942, Hughes joined the newly created 2nd SAS based at Philippeville, Algeria and began carrying out sabotage operations in Italy.

On 12 January 1944, Hughes and four others took off from an American airfield in southern Italy for Operation Pomegranate in support of the forthcoming allied landings at Anzio. The objective of the mission was the destruction of German reconnaissance aircraft at San Egidio. The group was scattered after coming into contact with a German sentry, and although Hughes and the raid commander Major Tony Widdrington found each other, the other members could not be located. The pair carried on with the mission, infiltrating the airfield on the night of 19 January and planting Lewes bombs which when detonated destroyed four Ju 88s, two Fieseler Storchs and one Ju 52. While defusing their unused bombs one exploded, killing Widdrington and leaving Hughes temporarily blind and concussed. He used his pistol to summon assistance, being captured by the Germans and taken to hospital in Perugia. The accident left Hughes deaf in one ear and blind in one eye for the remainder of his life.

By February the Gestapo was insistent that Hughes should be handed over to them to be shot as a saboteur; however a German officer managed to get Hughes classified as a prisoner of war, thereby keeping him at least temporarily safe from the Gestapo. Hughes later escaped, by jumping from a train, along with two other men and with assistance from local partisans reached Allied forces on 10 May 1944. Hughes received an MC and bar for the raid and his following escape.

After spending some time at an officers' rest camp Hughes returned to England to rejoin the 2nd SAS at Prestwick, Ayrshire. He was appointed commander of HQ squadron in 1945 before a jeep accident forced him to retire from the army at the rank of Major.

Called Jimmy Hughes while serving in the British Army, he wrote about his years as a soldier in a book, Who Cares Who Wins (1998), a play on the SAS motto "Who Dares Wins", that was published under the name of Jimmy Quentin Hughes MC in 1998.

== Post war ==
Hughes completed his architecture degree at Liverpool in 1946 and then moved to Leeds University to study for a PhD. His thesis on the architectural history of baroque Malta led to the publication of his first book, The Building of Malta 1530-1795 (1956).

He was appointed Senior Lecturer in Architecture at Leeds in 1948 and stayed until 1955 when he became a lecturer at the Liverpool School of Architecture. He was a Lecture and Studio Instructor in Architecture (1955–61), later Senior Lecturer in Architecture (1961–68) and Reader (1968–84) at the University of Liverpool. In 1984 he was made an Honorary Research Fellow of Liverpool University. The Quentin Hughes Collection, a mixture of notes, drawings and photographs, is held in the archives of the University of Liverpool. Photographs attributed to JQ Hughes are also held by the Conway Library, whose archive of primarily architectural images is in the process of being digitised under the wider Courtauld Connects project.

In 1964 Hughes published Seaport: Architecture & Townscape in Liverpool, in which he stressed the significance of the Victorian and Edwardian architectural inheritance of the city. Much of the city centre was saved because of his activities, which in particular helped preserve the Albert Dock Warehouses and the Oriel Chambers. The book was highly influential in starting a national trend opposing the architectural Brutalism of the 1960s. In 1967 he also wrote a detailed policy for the conservation of Liverpool's architecture which was adopted by the City Council.

In addition to his academic work Hughes also found time to practise as an architect, designing houses in Surrey, and working on conservation projects including Bridge Street, Chester (1962–4), Neston, Wirral (1967), and Greenbank House, Sefton Park, Liverpool (1969).

In 1968, while at Liverpool University, he was seconded to set up the School of Architecture at the University of Malta, becoming the first Professor of Architecture in 1970 but, after 'crossing swords' with the country's president Dom Mintoff, he returned to Liverpool in 1973.

Hughes was one of the founders of the Fortress Study Group in 1975 and served as the first editor of the group's journal, Fort, being internationally respected for his knowledge of military architecture.

== Later life ==
Hughes became the chairman of the Merseyside Civic Trust in 1995, serving until 2001. In this role he and his team stopped commercial development of a dedicated public space at Liverpool Pier Head. In 1999, he was appointed OBE in recognition of his work in conserving the architecture of north-west England and in 2000 was made an Honorary Professor of Architecture by Liverpool John Moores University. In 2004 he received Malta's highest civil honour, the National Order of Merit.

== Private life ==
In 1947, Hughes married Margaret Evans with whom he had two daughters. They divorced and he married Josephine Radcliff in 1983. They had a daughter.

== Publications ==
Hughes wrote numerous books including:

- The Building of Malta 1530–1795 (1956)
- Seaport: Architecture & Townscape in Liverpool (1964)
- Fortress: Architecture and Military History in Malta (1969). ISBN 99932-10-14-5
- Military Architecture (1974)
- Who Cares Who Wins (1998)
- Malta: The Baroque Island (2003)
