= Bernard de Gomme =

Dutch military engineer

Sir Bernard de Gomme (1620 – 23 November 1685) was a Dutch military engineer. By some he is considered the most important figure in 17th-century English military engineering.

== Early life ==
De Gomme was born in Terneuzen, Zeeland as the son of Maria Huybrechts and Pieter de Gomme, who in 1631 was in charge of supplies at the Dutch fortresses of Lillo and Liefkenshoek on either side of the mouth of the Scheldt near Antwerp. In his youth he served in the campaigns of Frederick Henry, prince of Orange, for example in the Gennep campaign of 1641. He afterwards accompanied Prince Rupert to England, and was knighted by Charles I. He served with conspicuous ability in the royalist army as engineer and quartermaster-general from June 1642 to May 1646, leaving England after the 1646 defeats of the first English Civil War. His plan of the fortifications and castle of Liverpool, dated 1644, is preserved in the British Museum.

== Return to Netherlands ==
In 1646, Gomme returned to the Netherlands, where he worked as civil engineer, amongst others at the construction of polders in Flanders. On 15 June 1649, Gomme received a commission from Charles II, then at Breda, to be quartermaster-general of all forces to be raised in England and Wales. On 16 September 1654 at Middelburg he married Catharina van Deynse, widow of Johannes Beverland, by whom he had a daughter, Anna. Gomme was present as military engineer at the Battle of the Dunes near Dunkirk in 1658. After the English Restoration he was restored to favour in England and was appointed there Surveyor-General of Fortifications in 1660. A collection of 63 drawings by De Gomme of fortified towns in the Low Countries (The Netherlands and Flanders) is now kept in the British Library in London.

== Restoration ==
In March 1661 he was promoted to engineer-in-chief of all the king's castles and fortifications in England and Wales. Among his first tasks were the repairs of Dover pier, the erection of fortifications at Dunkirk, and the surveying of Tilbury Fort. In August 1665 instructions were given for making the fortifications at Portsmouth according to the plans prepared by Gomme. On 14 November of the same year the king directed him to give his assistance to commissioners for making the Cam navigable, and establishing a communication with the Thames. Three days later he received a commission to build a new citadel on the Hoe of Plymouth. In March 1667, he accompanied the Duke of York to Harwich, which it was proposed to entrench completely all round. On returning to London he was summoned to give advice for fortifying the Medway and Portsmouth, as well as Harwich. After the raid by fellow Dutchman Michiel de Ruyter in 1667 on the Medway, De Gomme was asked to help with the fortification of Sheerness, to stop a raid like that from happening again. In 1673 and 1675 he was making surveys about Dublin. A reference to Gomme's design of building a fort-royal on the strand near Ringsend, in the neighbourhood of Dublin, occurs in the report of the elder Sir Jonas Moore, surveyor-general of ordnance, drawn up in 1675. In July 1682, Gomme was appointed surveyor-general of ordnance. He died in London on 23 November 1685, and was buried on the 30th of that month in the chapel of the Tower of London. He left liberal legacies to the Dutch Church in London and to Christ's Hospital. After Katherine's death, Gomme had remarried, by licence dated 15 October 1667, Catherine Lucas of Bevis Marks, a widow of fifty who died a few weeks before him, and was also buried in the Tower chapel, 19 October 1685.

== Gallery of work ==
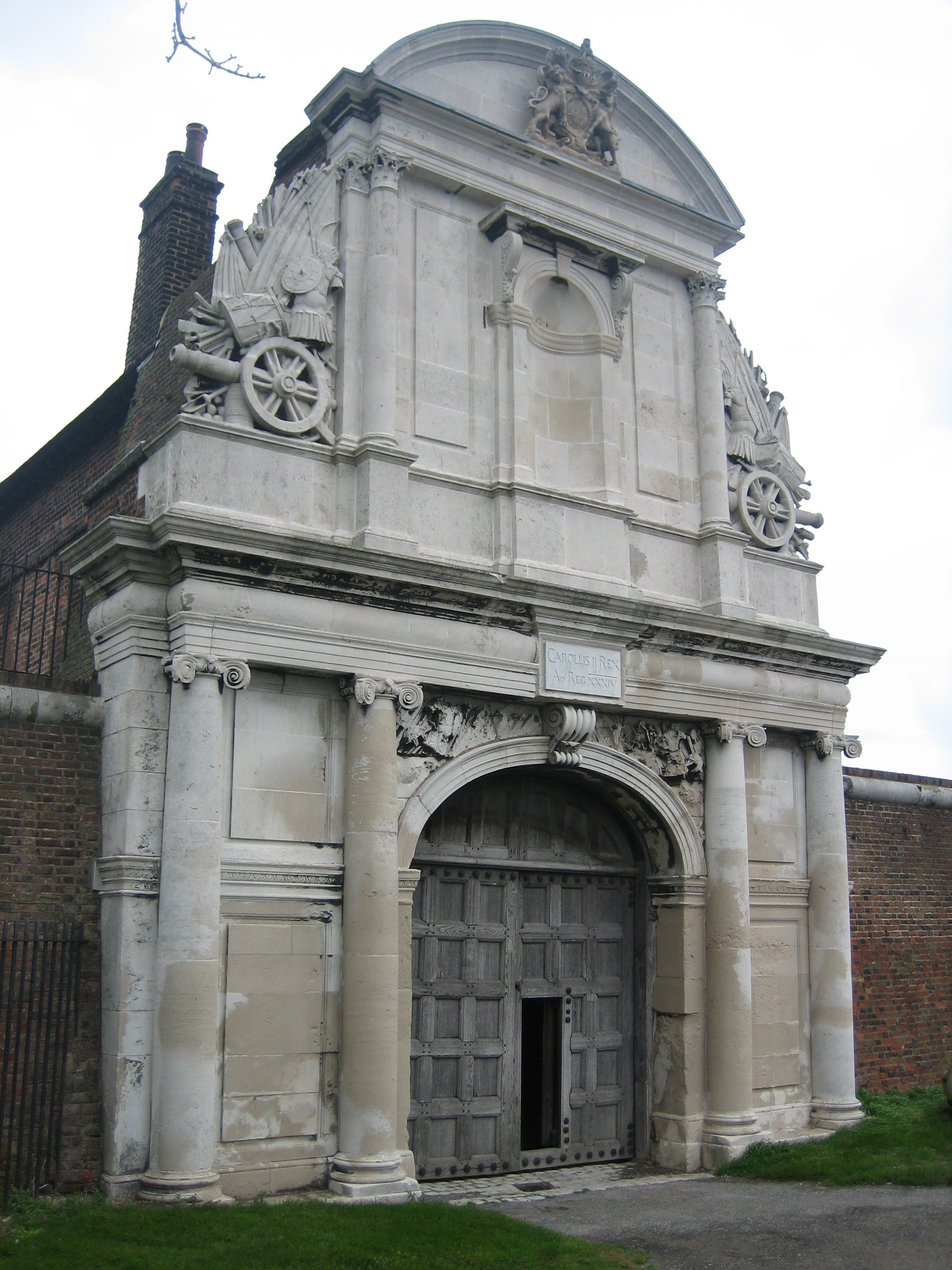
Water Gate, Tilbury Fort

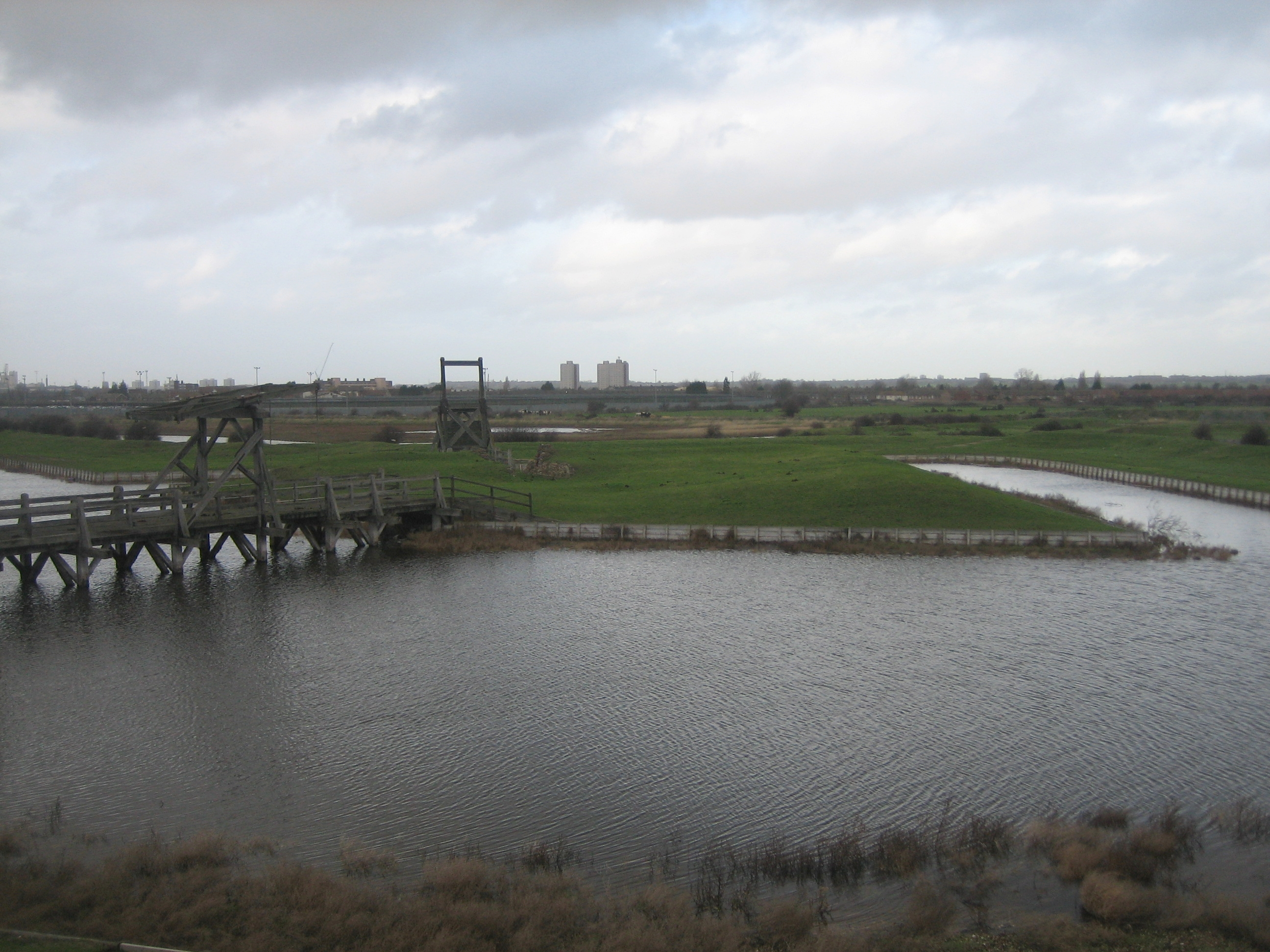
Ravelin, Tilbury Fort

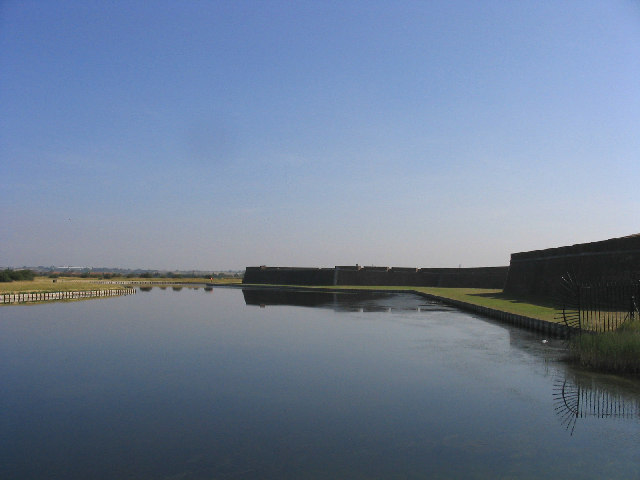
The Moat, Tilbury Fort

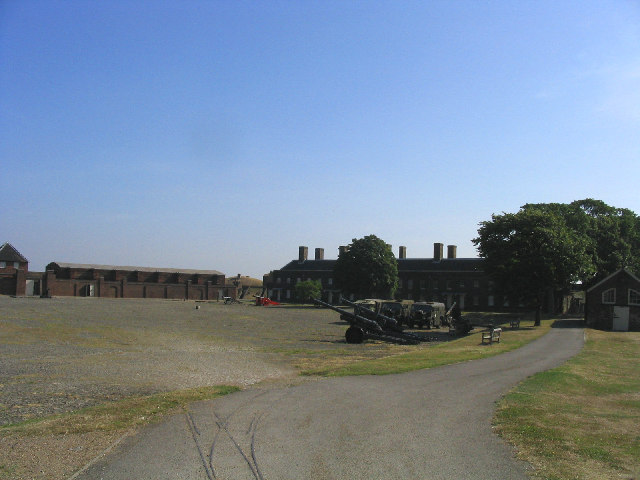
Interior, Tilbury Fort

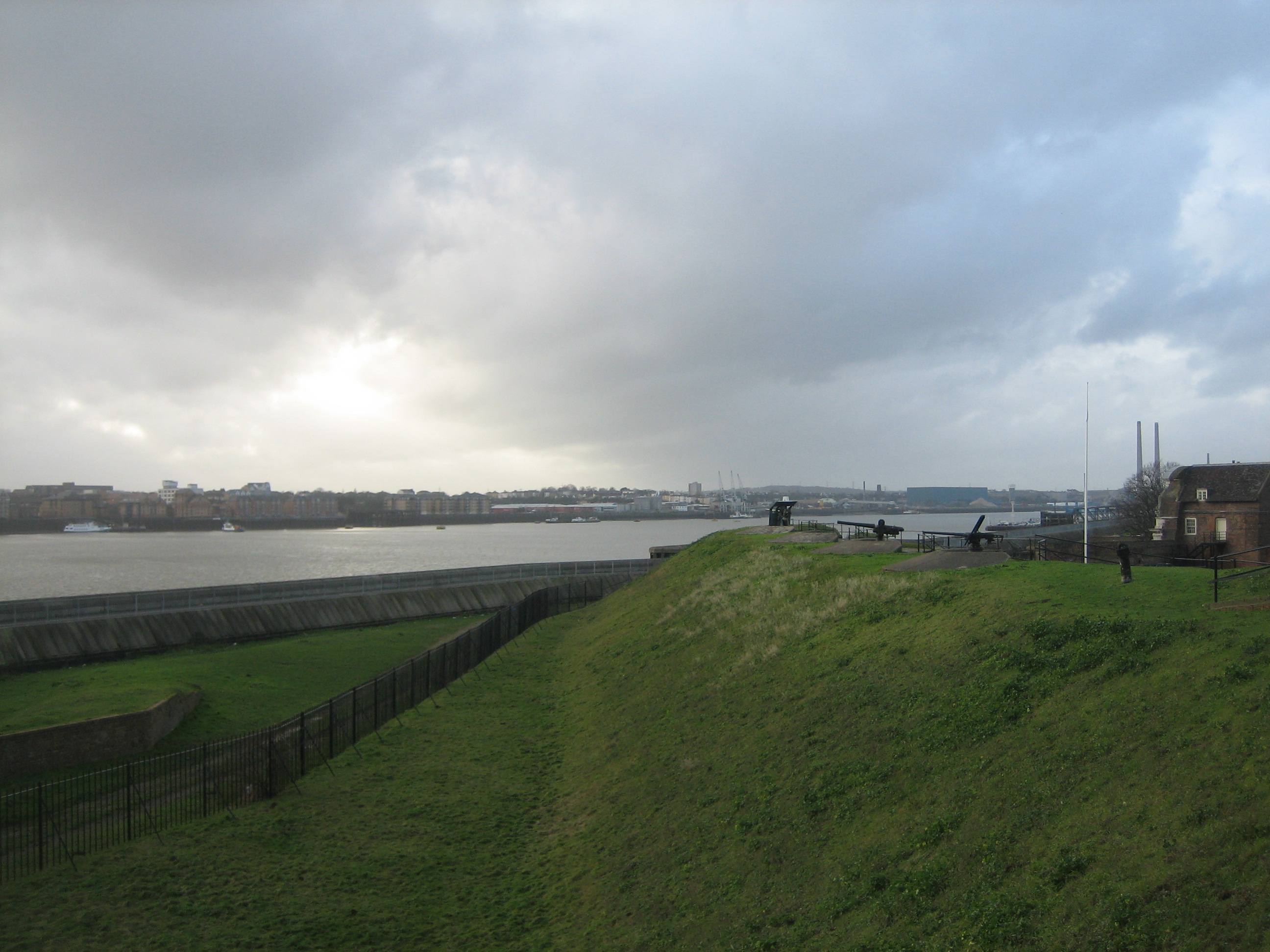
River Battery, Tilbury Fort

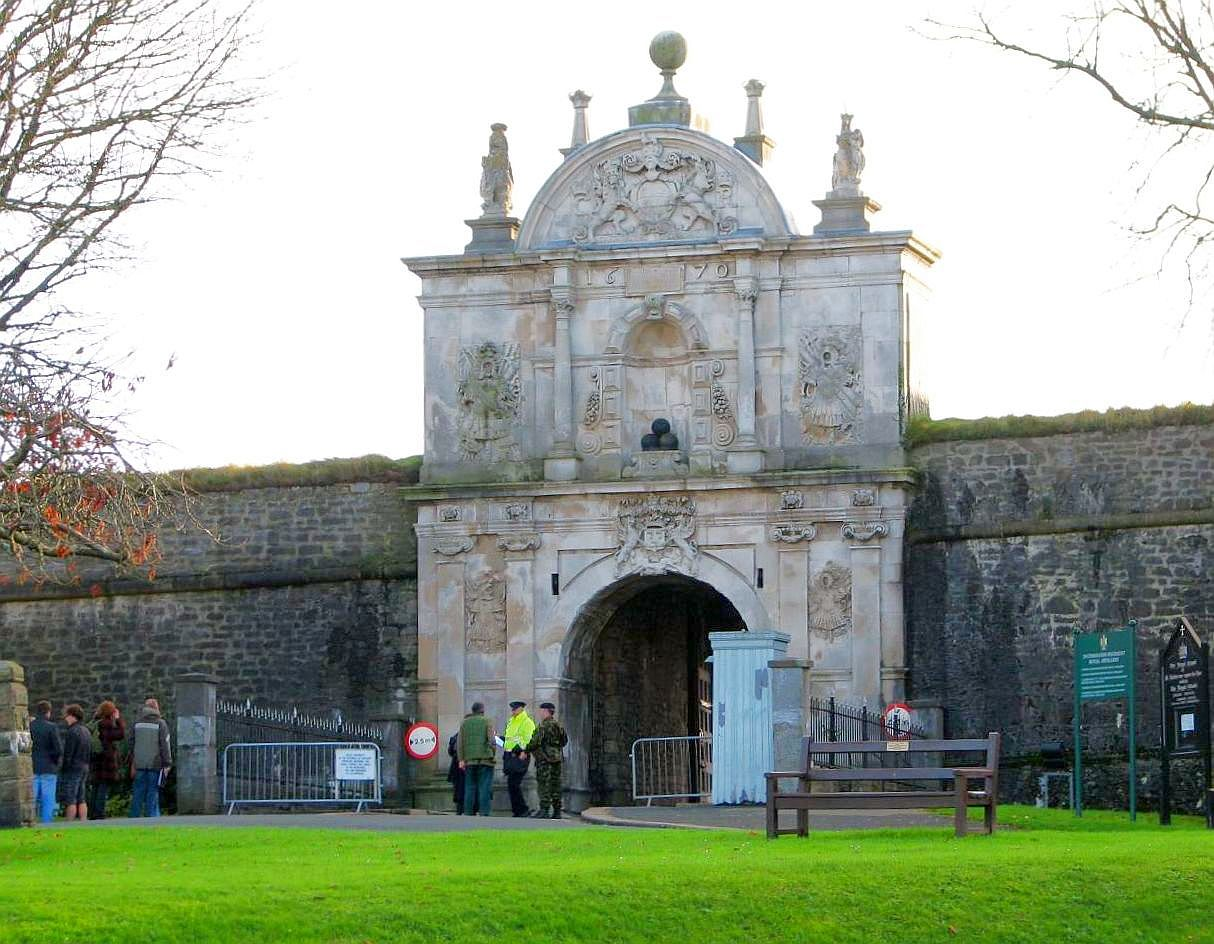
Main gate, The Royal Citadel Plymouth

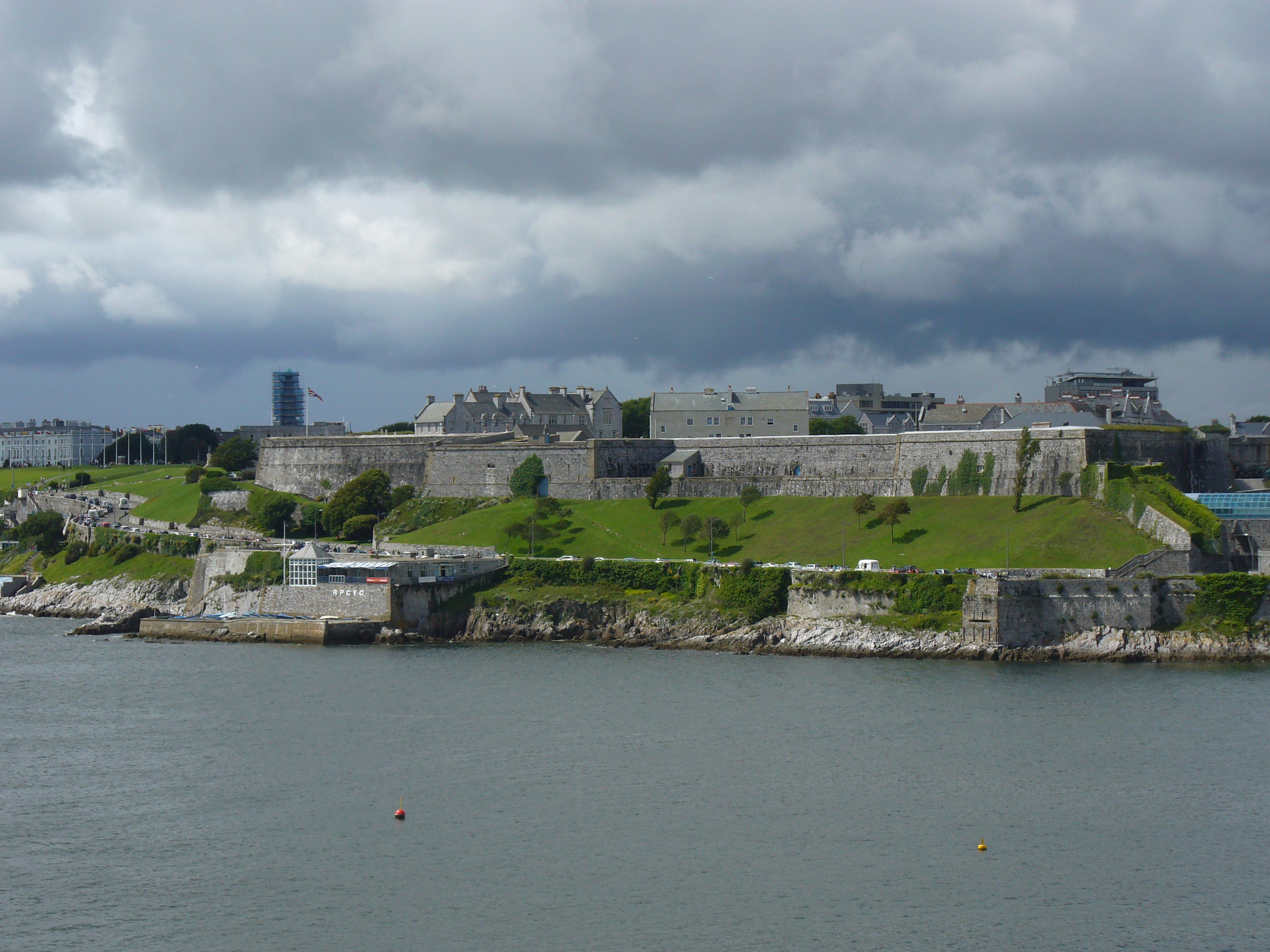
The Royal Citadel Plymouth

Military offices
Preceded by Sir Charles Lloyd	Chief Royal Engineer; April – December 1661	Succeeded by Sir Godfrey Lloyd
