= Fortress Study Group =

Charity devoted to the study and preservation of fortifications in the age of artillery

Fortress Study Group Logo

The Fortress Study Group is a charity registered in the UK with an international membership. Its purpose is advancing the study of post-medieval artillery fortifications throughout the World.

== History ==
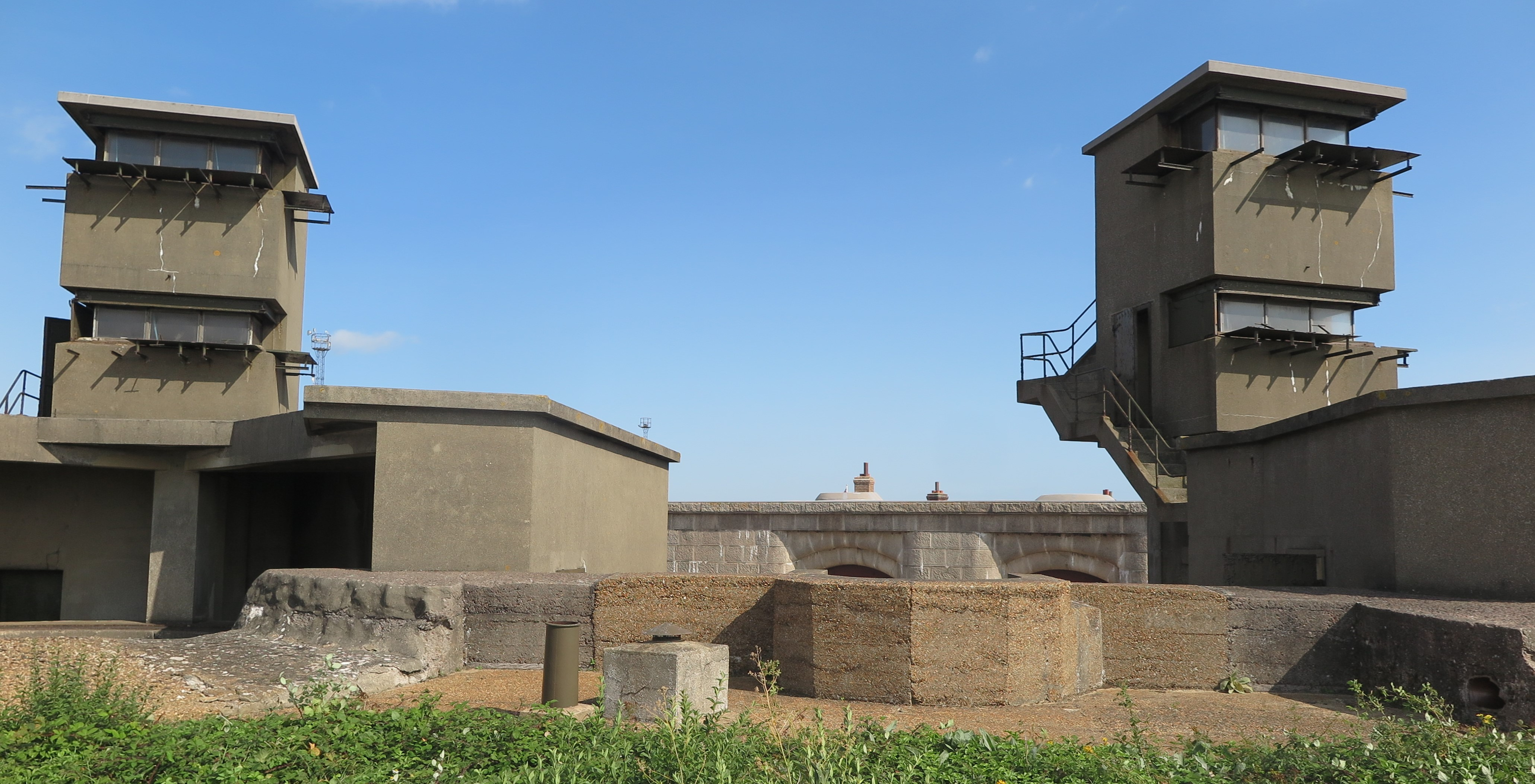
Landguard Fort, Felixstowe, showing different era’s artillery fortifications

The Fortress Study Group was formed in June 1975 at Pembroke College, Oxford amongst the founders were Jock Hamilton-Baillie, who became chairman in 1976, the late Quentin Hughes was the founding editor of the annual journal, and his Royal Highness the Duke of Gloucester remains as patron. Other notable members, past and present include Christopher Duffy, Simon Pepper, Anthony Kemp, Victor Smith, David Barnes, Major Davies & Mrs Davies, Sheila Sutcliffe, Arthur Corney, Henry Wills and the late Andrew Saunders, Ian V. Hogg and General Whitworth. There are currently around 600 members worldwide.

== Activities ==
The Group publishes an annual peer reviewed journal entitled FORT which contains articles on fortifications throughout the world. Three times as year a newsletter, CASEMATES, is published which also covers visits to fortifications, new and reviews. Annual Conferences and lecture days are held in the UK in order to disseminate new research on the subject. Tours of fortifications outside the UK are also organised, often with access to sites not open to the public, in co-operation with other similar groups and local councils. There is a specialist library on the subject of fortification which is held at Fort Nelson as part of the Armouries Collection.

The group also offers small grants for the publication of works on fortification, such as Ramparts of Empire and to Castle, Town defences and Artillery Fortifications in Britain and Ireland: a Bibliography 1945-2006

The preservation of fortifications through providing specialist advice to planners, developers, local authorities and owners. Small grants have also been made, called FSG Preservation Grants. For example, to: High Knoll Fort, St Helena; The Needles Battery, Isle of Wight for gun carriage restoration; the Royal Engineers Library and Museum, Chatham for a new display model of Fort Cliffe; and Fort Tourgis, Alderney for new signage for a battery. Starting in 2014 FSG makes an award to distinguish outstanding renovation of fortifications; the FSG Award is a plaque and was first awarded to Landguard Fort in Felixstowe.

The Fortress Study Group was involved in the Defence of Britain Project (April 1995 - March 2002) which aimed to record all surviving 20th century defences in Britain. The group surveyed 270 sites on the Holderness coast in the UK in 1992 on behalf of the Royal Commission on the Historic Monuments of England. This formed the basis of the Defence of Britain Project under the Council for British Archaeology.

In December 2015 a new joint project was started: The Defence of Gibraltar Project. It is a collaborative effort between the Friends of Gibraltar and the Fortress Study Group. The Government of Gibraltar is fully supporting this endeavour. The purpose of this Project is to create a definitive database of the military landscape in Gibraltar (circa 1704 to 1960). The information will be collected from field visits and examination of historic documents. At this stage it is proposed to run the project for two years, subject to an annual review on progress. The information collected on the database will be made available to the Government of Gibraltar, and in particular the Gibraltar Heritage Trust, with a view to the future preservation of sites of interest. The newly formed, Fortress of Gibraltar Group are also coordinating their research with this Project, concentrating their efforts on the World War 2 landscape. See

Individual members have also been involved with restoration projects such as Fort Amherst, Harwich Redoubt, The Needles Batteries, Newhaven Fort and Chapel Bay Fort.
