= Jock Hamilton-Baillie =

- Born: 1 March 1919; Carlisle, Cumberland, England, UK
- Died: 16 April 2003 (aged 84); Stanford in the Vale, Oxfordshire, England, UK
- Military career
- Allegiance: United Kingdom
- Branch: Royal Engineers
- Service years: –1974
- Rank: Brigadier
- Nickname: HB
- Conflicts: World War II
- Awards: Military Cross

John Robert Edward Hamilton-Baillie MC (1 March 1919 – 16 April 2003), was a British Royal Engineers officer famed for numerous escapes from German prisoner of war camps during World War II. During his later life he was a founder of the Fortress Study Group, a prominent member of the Concrete Society, and a dedicated fund raiser for the Red Cross.

== Early life ==
John Robert Edward Hamilton-Baillie was born at Carlisle, Cumberland, on 1 March 1919. A scion of the noble Hamilton family, he was descended from the sixth Earl of Haddington. He was educated at Clifton College and the Royal Military Academy, Woolwich, following which he was commissioned into the Royal Engineers and posted to the 26th Field Company.

== Second World War ==
Hamilton-Baillie's company was mobilised with the 1st Division and sent to France at the start of the war. Shortly afterwards the company was transferred to the 51st (Highland) Infantry Division and stationed in the Saar region to gain experience on the Maginot Line. With the advance of the German forces, Hamilton-Baillie was wounded and captured at Saint-Valery-en-Caux. After recovering from his wounds he was moved to a prison camp at Peronne from which he and another officer escaped but were recaptured after three days. Hamilton-Baillie was moved again to Oflag VII-C at Laufen from which he attempted to escape via a tunnel, but the exit was discovered before the escape could be made.

As a result of his efforts, Hamilton-Baillie was moved to Oflag VII-D at Tittmoning, a medieval castle on an isolated plateau in Bavaria, Germany. Making his next escape alone in spring 1941 he let himself through the wire and walked on foot a distance of almost 200 miles in ten days towards the Swiss border. Unfortunately his map was inaccurate and he was recaptured a matter of yards from freedom.

Shortly after his return to Tittmoning, Hamilton-Baillie was moved to Oflag VI-B at Warburg. In conjunction with the men there a mass escape was planned involving hinged ladders to cross the wire and a tunnel, the escape being covered by fusing of the camp lights and a diversion. Forty one prisoners escaped, three of whom managed to get back to Britain; one escapee died when the tunnel collapsed.

Hamilton-Baillie was next held in Oflag VII-B at Eichstätt in Bavaria. Here he joined a group of tunnellers in a well-organised escape group, helping to build a long well-supported tunnel with forced air ventilation and electric lighting. In June 1943 Hamilton-Baillie and 64 others staged a mass breakout but all were recaptured within two weeks.

Finally, Hamilton-Baillie was moved to Oflag IV-C (Colditz Castle) from which he made a number of attempts to escape but remained incarcerated until liberation by the 69th Infantry Division (United States) in April 1945. In December 1945 he was awarded the Military Cross for his many escape attempts and assistance to other prisoners.

== Post war service ==
After the war Hamilton-Baillie attended Sidney Sussex College, Cambridge, graduating from the University of Cambridge with a First in Mechanical Sciences. In 1950 he attended Staff College in Camberley and was then posted to the 44th Parachute Brigade as brigade major. This was followed by a series of BAOR postings starting with the command of 5 Field Squadron RE in 1953. In 1959 he became chief instructor of the Army Apprentices School in Chepstow. After a series of senior administrative roles in the Middle East and Germany, his final appointment was as Brigadier Engineer Plans in the Ministry of Defence during which he was aide-de-camp (ADC) to the Queen between 1972 and 1974.

== Later life ==
Hamilton-Baillie retired from the army in 1974 and spent the following 10 years as lecturer in soil mechanics and geology at the Royal Military College of Science, Shrivenham. He was one of the founding members of the Fortress Study Group in 1975 and served as chairman for a number of years. He was also a firm supporter of the Red Cross and a prominent member of the Concrete Society.

== Honours and awards ==
- 20 December 1945 - Lieutenant John Robert Edward Hamilton-Baillie (85553), Corps of Royal Engineers, is awarded the Military Cross in recognition of gallant and distinguished services in the field.
