= Andrew Saunders =

British military historian

Andrew Downing Saunders (22 September 1931 – 13 March 2009) was an internationally recognised expert in artillery fortifications and Chief Inspector of Ancient Monuments and Historic Buildings in England between 1973 and 1989.

== Early life ==
Andrew Saunders was born at St Austell, Cornwall, on 22 September 1931. He was educated at Magdalen College School, Oxford, which was followed by his National Service in the RAF. On returning to civilian life Saunders read History at Magdalen College. During his time at university Saunders was president of the Archaeology Society, played rugby, and rowed for his college.

== Professional career ==
Saunders joined the Ancient Monuments Inspectorate in 1954 where his work revolved around the conservation and guardianship of castles and monastic buildings. He also took part in archaeological excavations such as that at Castle Gotha near St Austell. As part of his work, in 1956 he carried out a rapid assessment of the mainly 19th-century fortifications vacated that year by the army with the abolition of Coastal Artillery. The report Saunders submitted lead to the decision to take into care certain important examples of military architecture such as Fort Brockhurst and the Western Heights at Dover. The survey started what became a lifelong specialisation of Saunders' work in the study of artillery fortification.

In 1964 Saunders was promoted to Inspector of Ancient Monuments for England becoming responsible for the care of over four hundred monuments throughout England. In 1973 Saunders was promoted again to Chief Inspector of Ancient Monuments and Historic Buildings, a position he held until his retirement in 1989.

Saunders was an influential figure in the field of castle studies, and directed excavations at Launceston Castle and Lydford Castle (both in Devon).

== Later life ==
Saunders was an active member of a number of historical and archaeological groups both during his working life and after his retirement in 1989. His roles included president of the Cornwall Archaeological Society (1968–1972), founder member and later chairman of the Fortress Study Group (1995–2001), and founder and editor of the quarterly publication, 'Fortress'. Saunders was also a long serving council member of the Royal Archaeological Institute and president between 1993 and 1996 and chairman of the advisory panel for the Defence of Britain Project. The international reputation Saunders held led to him being appointed chairman of the International Fortress Council between 1995 and 1998.

== Publications ==
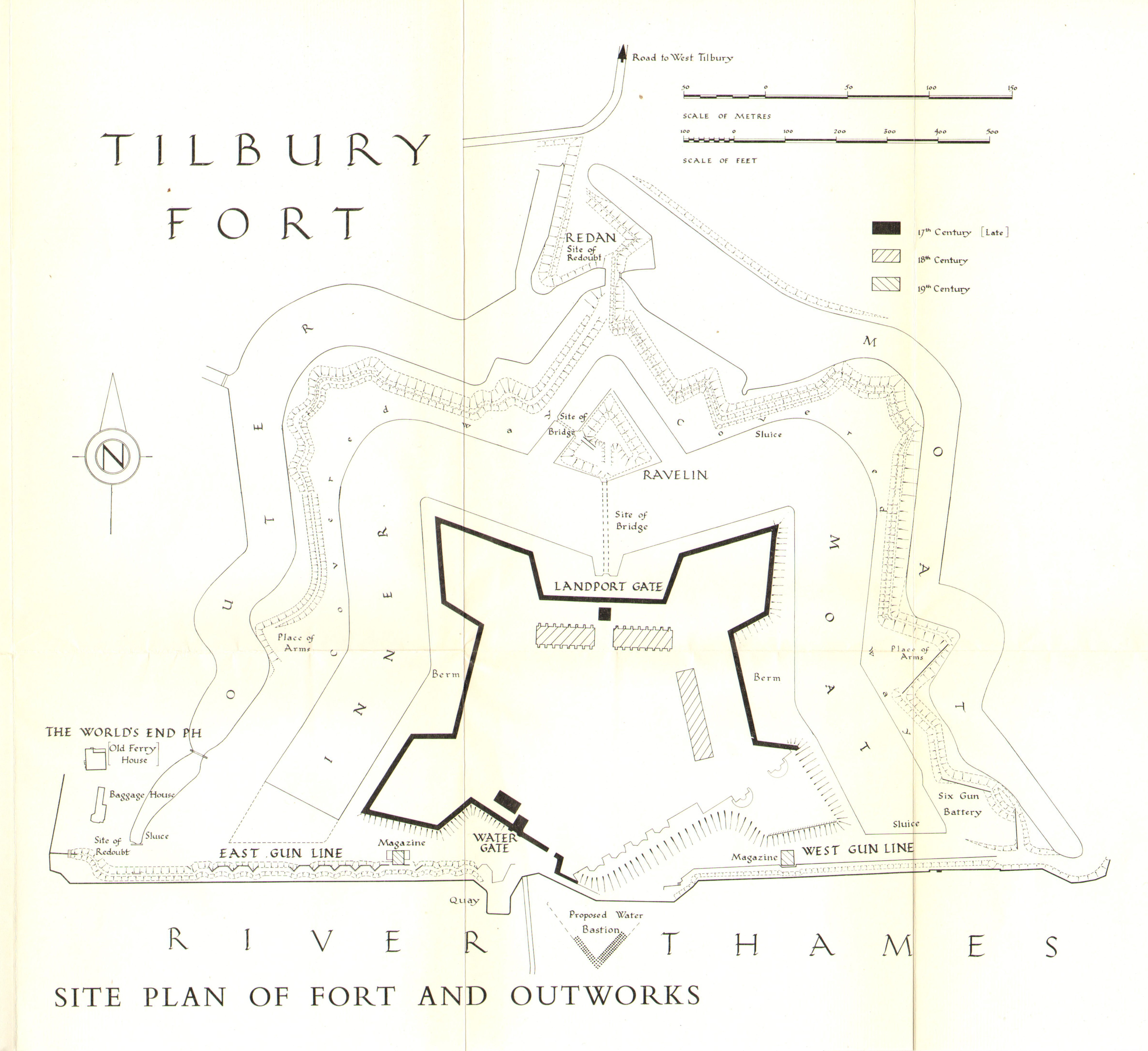
Site Plan of Tilbury Fort, Essex. From Saunders (1960)

- Saunders, Andrew D. (1960). "Tilbury Fort and the Development of Artillery Fortifications in the Thames Estuary". The Antiquaries Journal. 40 (3–4): 152–174. doi:10.1017/s0003581500061928. S2CID 129086005.
- Saunders, Andrew D. (1960). Tilbury Fort: Essex. London, UK: Her Majesty's Stationery Office. Amended edition (1977) ISBN 0-1167-0311-3
- Saunders, A. D. (1963). Deal & Walmer Castles Guidebook. Her Majesty's Stationery Office (HMSO). OCLC 1008177948.
- Saunders, A.D. (1965). Dartmouth Castle. London: Her Majesty's Stationery Office (HMSO).
- Saunders, A. D. (January 1966). "Hampshire Coastal Defence Since the Introduction of Artillery with a Description of Fort Wallington". Archaeological Journal. 123 (1): 136–171. doi:10.1080/00665983.1966.11077403. eISSN 2373-2288. ISSN 0066-5983.
- Saunders, Andrew D. (1989). Fortress Britain: Artillery Fortifications in the British Isles and Ireland. Liphook, UK: Beaufort. ISBN 1855120003.
- Book of Channel Defences, English Heritage, London, 1997, ISBN 0-7134-7595-1
- Fortress Builder: Bernard de Gomme: Charles II's Military Engineer, University of Exeter Press, 2004, ISBN 0-85989-751-6
- "Upnor Castle and gunpowder supply to the navy 1801-4," The Mariner's Mirror, 91 (2) May 2005, 160-74
