= Operation Pomegranate (SAS) =

WW2 British covert operation (Jan 1944)

Operation Pomegranate was a six-man raid in support of Operation Shingle by the Special Air Service designed to be conducted against German aircraft based on the Italian airfield of Sant'Egidio, near Perugia, on the night of 12 January 1944. The commandos, aboard a C-47 of the USAAF, made their parachute jump on the slopes of Monte Tezio to the east of Lake Trasimeno, after which the plane on which they had been travelling crashed into the mountainside killing the entire crew. (Note: (MACR 24 January 1944 lists them as: Pilot L/Col. R.A. Nowotny; Co-pilot Capt.J.J. McNeill Jr.; Navigator 1st Lt. J.J. Piatak; Pilot surgeon Capt.J.L. Nocentini; Engineer T/Sgt. R.A. Holmes; Radio Operator Sgt. S. Singer)

Although all six paratroopers landed safely, the group split up after being challenged by a German sentry as they crossed the Tiber. Lance Corporal J. Malloy and Privates T. Cox, A. Todd, and S. McCormick did not take part in the attack on the airfield but rejoined their units down in Apulia, leaving Major Tony Widdrington and Lieutenant Jimmy Quentin Hughes to go ahead and reach the target, planting bombs on seven airplanes and destroying three. One of the remaining bombs exploded while being made safe, killing Widdrington and temporarily blinding Hughes in one eye. Hughes was taken to the German military hospital in Perugia, and was destined to be shot as a commando, but he enlisted the help of a German doctor with whom he struck up a friendship and managed to acquire the status of Prisoner of War, after which he was transferred to another military hospital in Florence. After escaping with two others from a POW transport train bound for Germany, he made his way south and rejoined the allied lines.
