= New Tavern Fort =

Historic artillery fort in Gravesend, Kent, England

- Gravesend, Kent
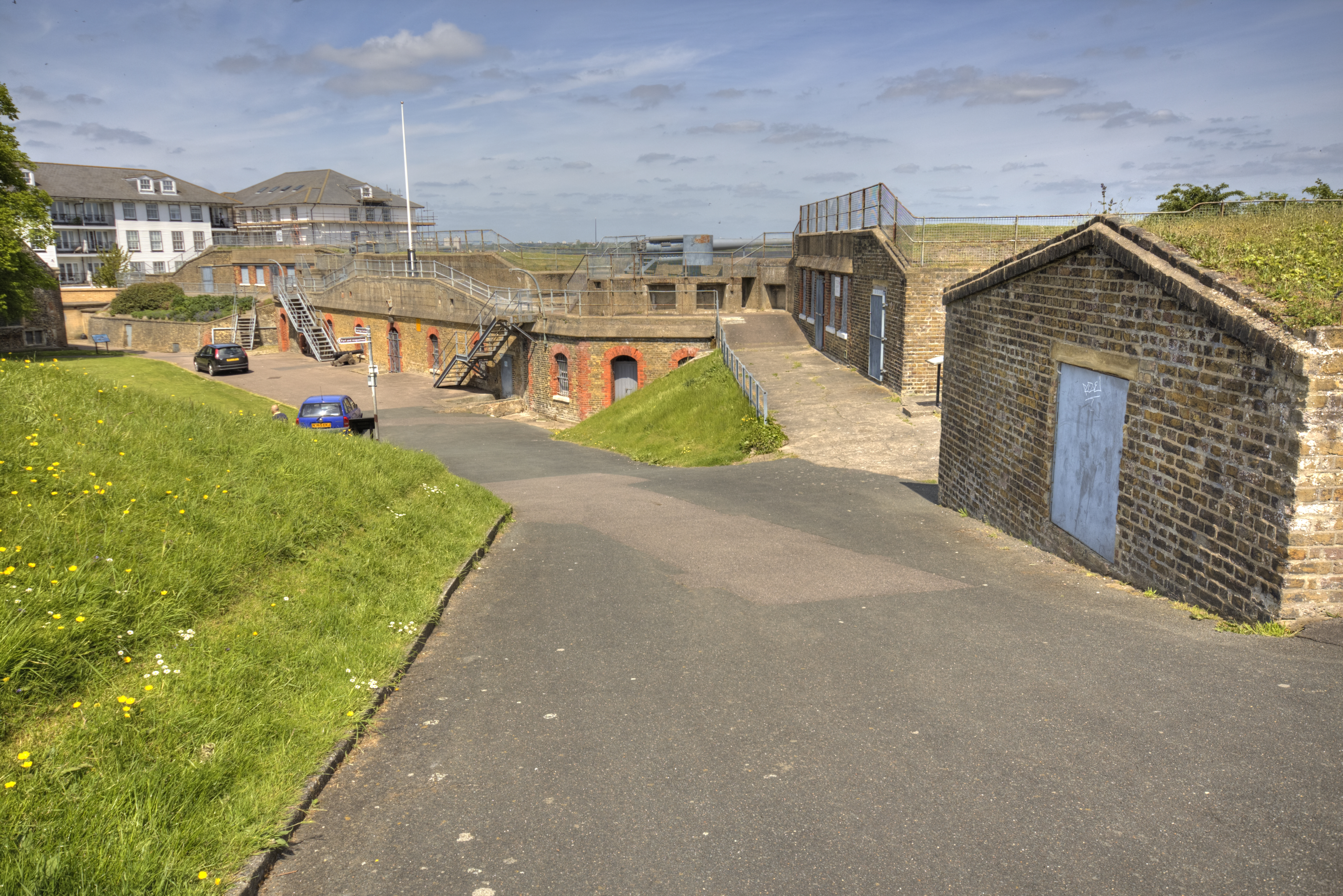
- Ramparts and emplacements at New Tavern Fort

Site information
- Type: Fortification
- Controlled by: Gravesham Borough Council
- Open to the public: Yes
- Condition: Interior buildings mostly demolished, emplacements and magazines preserved

Location
- Coordinates: 51.443626°N 0.376782°E

Site history
- Built: ca. 1780–83
- Built by: United Kingdom
- In use: ca. 1780–1950s
- Materials: Earth, brick, concrete

New Tavern Fort is an historic artillery fort in Gravesend, Kent. Dating mostly from the 18th and 19th centuries, it is an unusually well-preserved example of an 18th-century fortification and remained in use for defensive purposes until the Second World War. It was built during the American War of Independence to guard the Thames against French and Spanish raiders operating in support of the newly formed United States of America. It was redesigned and rebuilt in the mid-19th century to defend against a new generation of iron-clad French warships.

By the start of the 20th century, the Thames defences had been moved further downriver to the estuary and the fort was disarmed. Its grounds were opened to the public as pleasure gardens, but the fort was temporarily taken back into military use during the Second World War. Today the fort and its magazines and other underground structures have been restored and are open to the public. It is unique in the UK for its display of guns and emplacements ranging from the 18th to the 20th centuries.

== Description ==
=== Ramparts and emplacements ===
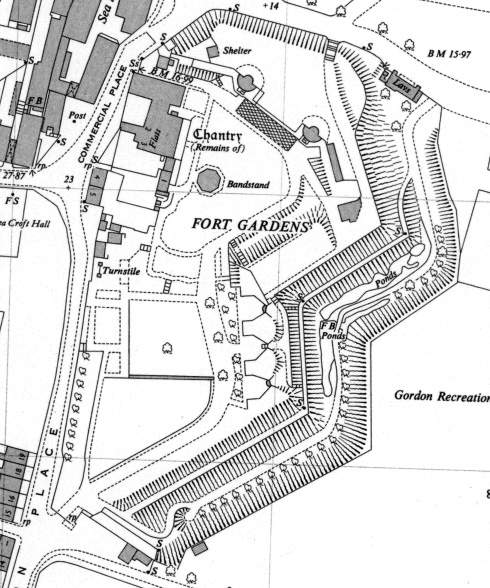
Map of New Tavern Fort

The fort is situated on the south bank of the River Thames, intended to support the much older Tilbury Fort on the north bank. The structure consists of a broad earthen rampart constructed in a zig-zag pattern, with a broad ditch in front of it. Eight emplacements, six of brick and two of concrete, are contained within the rampart with magazines underneath them. The interior of the fort - originally its parade ground - is occupied by a grass-covered lawn with flowerbeds, trees, ornamental bushes and a bandstand at the centre.

The ramparts face the river and can be divided into three sectors. The northern sector, originally called the North Face, contains two concrete semi-circular emplacements in which two 6" breech-loading guns were installed in 1904. They are still occupied by guns of this type, though not the originals; this makes New Tavern Fort the only example in the UK of a fully re-armed two-gun 6" battery for breech-loading guns. A concrete fire position is located immediately to the west and the remains of its instrument pillar can still be seen.

The middle sector - the easternmost part of the north rampart - was originally known as the Garden Face for its proximity to the gardens in the interior of the fort. It contains four brick emplacements built in 1868–72 to house rifled muzzle loader (RML) guns. One is protected by a thick iron shield with a gun-port in the middle, while the other three have unprotected open embrasures. All four are very well-preserved and still retain the rails on which the guns traversed. Doors on either side give access to the ammunition shafts which brought shells and cartridges up from the magazine. The shielded embrasure has been re-armed with an RML gun, making it a rare example of an embrasure of this type that has retained its original appearance.

The southern sector of the rampart was known as the East Face, for its direction facing the river. It incorporates two small brick emplacements constructed in the 1860s. They originally housed a pair of traversing guns that fired en barbette.

=== Magazines and other features ===
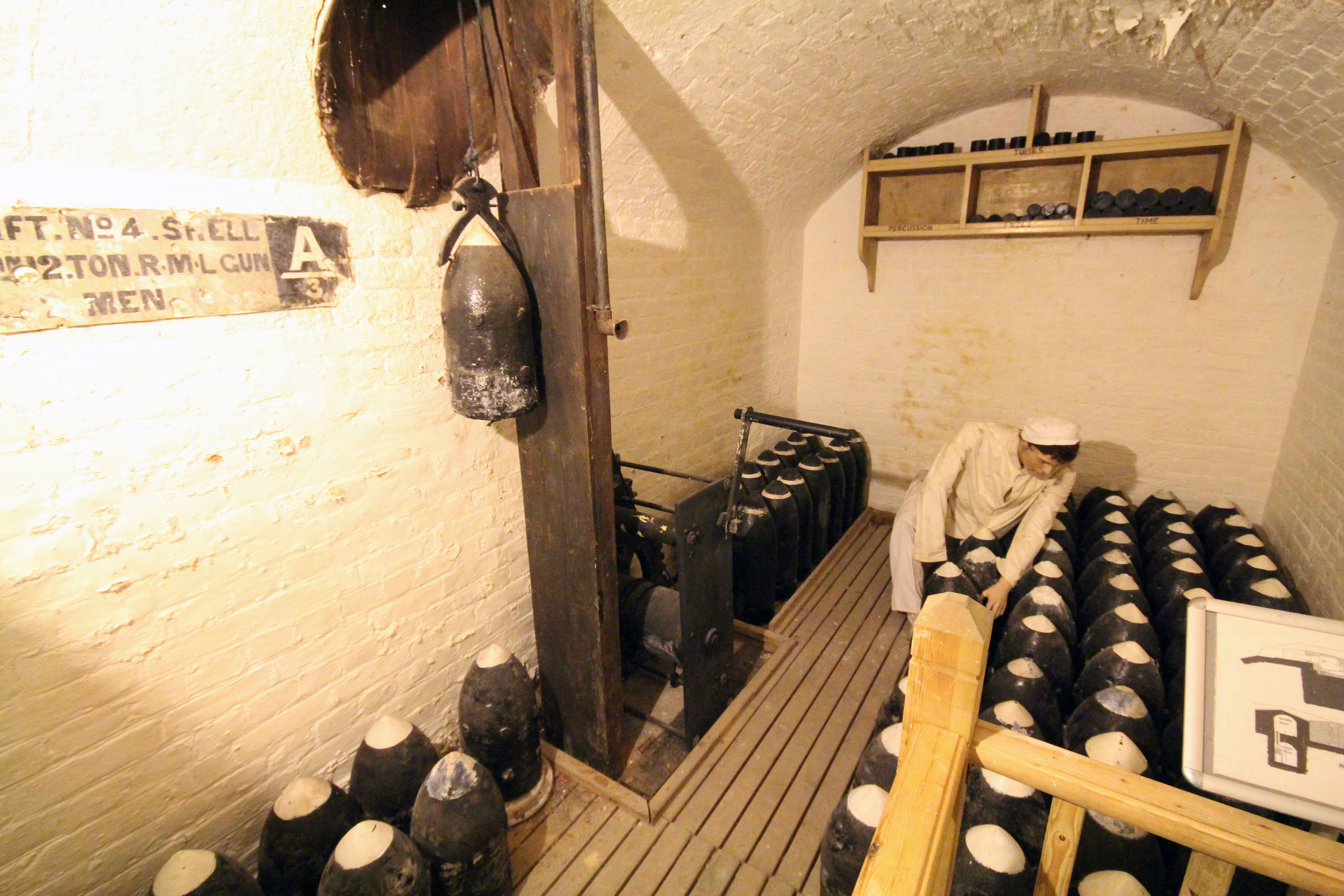
Restored expense store with replica shells and hoist

The entrance to the magazines is in the middle rampart and gives access to a 600-foot-long (180 m) and 4-foot-wide (1.2 m) brick tunnel which zig-zags under the rampart. Sixteen storage rooms serving as expense magazines for cartridges and shells are situated off the tunnel, with ammunition lifts linking them to the gun positions above. The main magazine consisted of two cartridge and shell stores, from where the ammunition would be transported along the tunnel to the smaller expense stores. To ensure that there was no possibility of sparks or naked flames causing explosions, safety lighting was provided from behind glass screens while the magazine workers had to wear special magazine slippers and safety clothing to ensure that they could not create sparks when they moved.

The magazines have been partly refurbished with displays illustrating how they were used and exhibits relating to the military history of Gravesend, and are open as a visitor attraction on summer weekends. A separate brick-arched magazine lies below the north rampart and was used to store ammunition for the 6″ guns, as well as a fire appliance.

A wide ditch lies in front of the ramparts. Its width was increased in the 1860s, when it originally contained a fence intended to serve as an obstacle to attacking infantry. It is now filled with ornamental plants, pools and paths, and is designated as a nature area.

Almost nothing now remains of the original internal barracks and administration buildings. The only substantial exception is the medieval Milton Chantry, the oldest building in Gravesend, which was used as a barracks.

== History ==
=== Strategic context ===
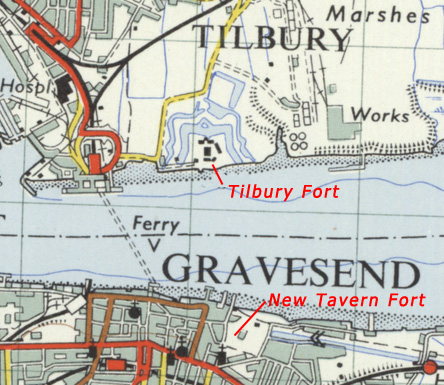
Location of New Tavern and Tilbury Forts

The lower Thames was of great strategic significance as the location of major military installations including the dockyard and arsenal at Woolwich, the powder magazine at Purfleet, and the victualling stores and shipyard at Deptford. In addition, it was essential to ensure that an enemy could not make a landing along the Thames, which offered a potential land corridor to London. The crossing between Gravesend and Tilbury was also of considerable importance, which had prompted the Tudors to build fortifications on both sides of the river at that point.

The impetus for the construction of New Tavern Fort came from the threat posed by the United Kingdom's adversaries in the American War of Independence - the newly created United States of America and its European allies, France and Spain. Serious weaknesses in British coastal defences had been revealed in 1778 by the American adventurer John Paul Jones in his raid on Whitehaven, Cumbria. The activities of his squadron on the British east coast the following year, along with the failed Franco-Spanish Armada of 1779, prompted the British government to commission a survey of the country's coastal defences. The state of the defences was found to be unacceptably deficient and plans were made for the building of 30 new batteries, positioned in an arc along the southern and eastern English coast from Norfolk to Cornwall.

The Thames portion of the survey was carried out by the engineer Thomas Hyde Page. He recommended the refurbishment of the existing Tudor-era Tilbury Fort on the riverbank opposite Gravesend, and the construction of an entirely new fort to replace the older Gravesend Blockhouse, another Tudor-era fortification of which only traces now remain. The new fort would be located 250 metres (820 ft) to the east of the blockhouse, where it would have a greater reach downriver and would be able to cross its fire with that of Tilbury Fort. With fears increasing of a French invasion in support of their American allies, the government approved Page's proposals and construction began soon afterwards.

=== Construction and early years ===
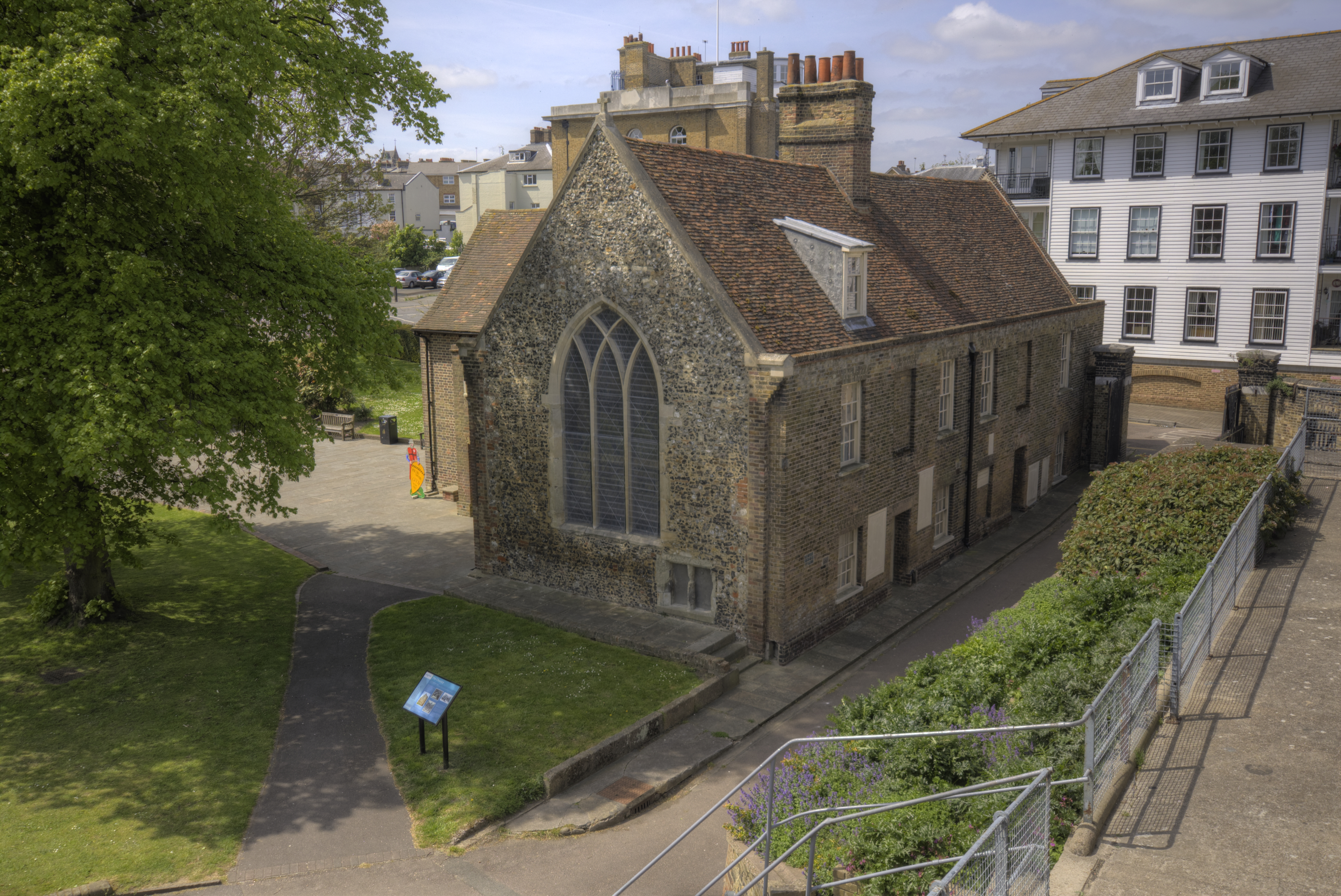
Milton Chantry's chapel, the last surviving part of a medieval hospital that was incorporated into the fort and used as barracks

The fort was constructed between 1780 and 1783 on a site originally occupied by the New Tavern Inn, from which it took its name. As the land was private property occupied by a Mr. Houghton, a vesting act (the Plymouth, Sheerness, Gravesend, Tilbury – Fortifications Act 1780, 20 Geo. 3. c. 38) was passed to purchase it. It was originally an irregularly shaped unrevetted earthwork consisting of two batteries linked by a rampart. The first battery had two faces forming an angle towards the river, while the second smaller battery had a straight front. It was protected on the riverside by a flat-bottomed ditch within which was a pallisade made of timber standing about 3 metres (9.8 ft) high. The two batteries were armed with fifteen heavy guns (24 and 32 pdrs.) which fired through embrasures.

Milton Chantry was incorporated into the fort's perimeter and was converted into an artillery barracks. By the 1790s, additional buildings had been constructed, including quarters for the commanding officer, stables and magazines. The rear of the fort was originally open, but by the end of the 18th century a defence wall and caponier with loopholes for muskets had been built to close it off. A kiln was also built to heat shot to a red heat for setting ships on fire.

=== 19th century reconstructions ===
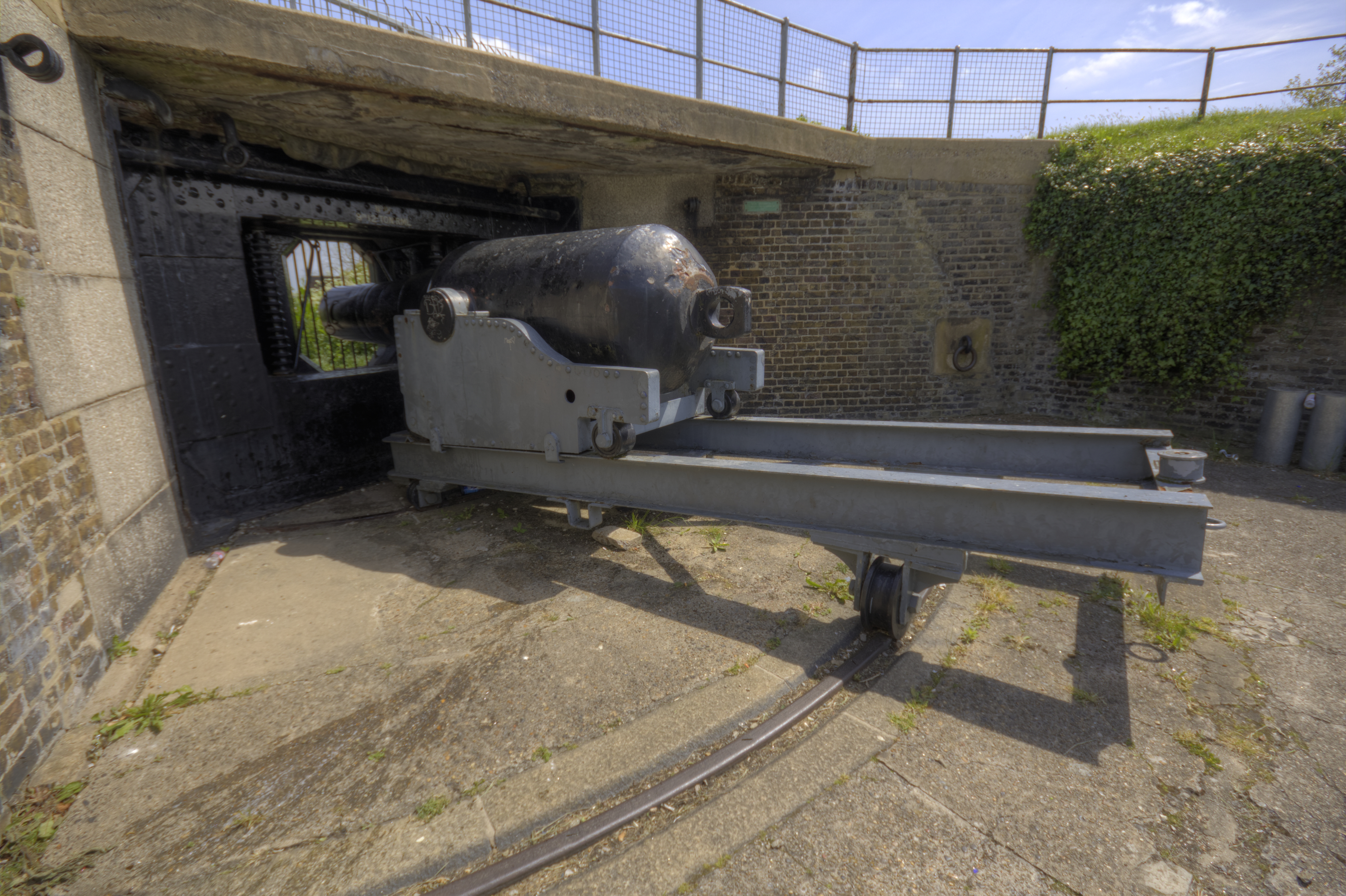
Replica 9-inch RML gun in a shielded emplacement, constructed in the late 1860s

During the 19th century, New Tavern Fort underwent major reconstructions, though it retained its basic plan and earthworks. The gun emplacements were modernised in 1848 to install platforms for traversing guns, and further magazines were built. Further upgrades were soon needed. By the end of the 1850s, Britain and France were engaged in a naval arms race. A new class of ironclad ships with powerful rifled muzzle loader (RML) guns, exemplified by the British HMS Warrior and the French La Gloire, posed a substantial threat to existing coastal defences. In response, the British government established a Royal Commission on the Defence of the United Kingdom to review the defences and make recommendations on improvements. Noting the importance of the Thames and its vulnerability to seaborne attack, the Commission advocated in its report in 1860 that two principal lines of defence should be established along the Thames. Three forts would be constructed or rebuilt - Shornemead Fort and Cliffe Fort in Kent and Coalhouse Fort in Essex - to provide an outer line of defence, with further forts and batteries protecting key sites further downriver. The inner line of defence would be provided by Tilbury Fort and New Tavern Fort.

The fort underwent one more rearming before the Commissioners' recommendations were put into effect. Its existing guns were replaced in 1859 by ten 68-pounder guns, among the most powerful smooth-bore guns in service at the time, with a range of up to 3,500 yards (3,200 m). Two of the 68-pdrs. were replaced by 1865 with a pair of 10-inch shell guns, with a further 8-inch shell gun added, though all were still smooth-bore guns. Four early breech-loading RBL 40 pounder Armstrong guns mounted on field carriages had replaced the earlier movable guns in 1862.

The focus of the Army's fortification efforts was initially on the outer forts at Coalhouse Point, Cliffe and Shornemead, and it was not until January 1868 that instructions were issued by the War Office to reconstruct Tilbury and New Tavern Forts. The existing magazines and ramparts were demolished and new brick emplacements were built, on which were mounted ten 9-inch and one 12-inch RML guns capable of ranges of up to 4,600 yards (4,200 m). Seven of the emplacements were protected by iron shields. The ramparts were extensively remodelled to accommodate new magazines, which were connected via lift shafts to serving rooms adjoining the emplacements. Colonel (later General) Charles George Gordon, who was to become famous for his death in the Siege of Khartoum in 1885, lived in Fort House in the grounds of the fort between 1865 and 1871 while he was overseeing the project.

=== 20th century ===
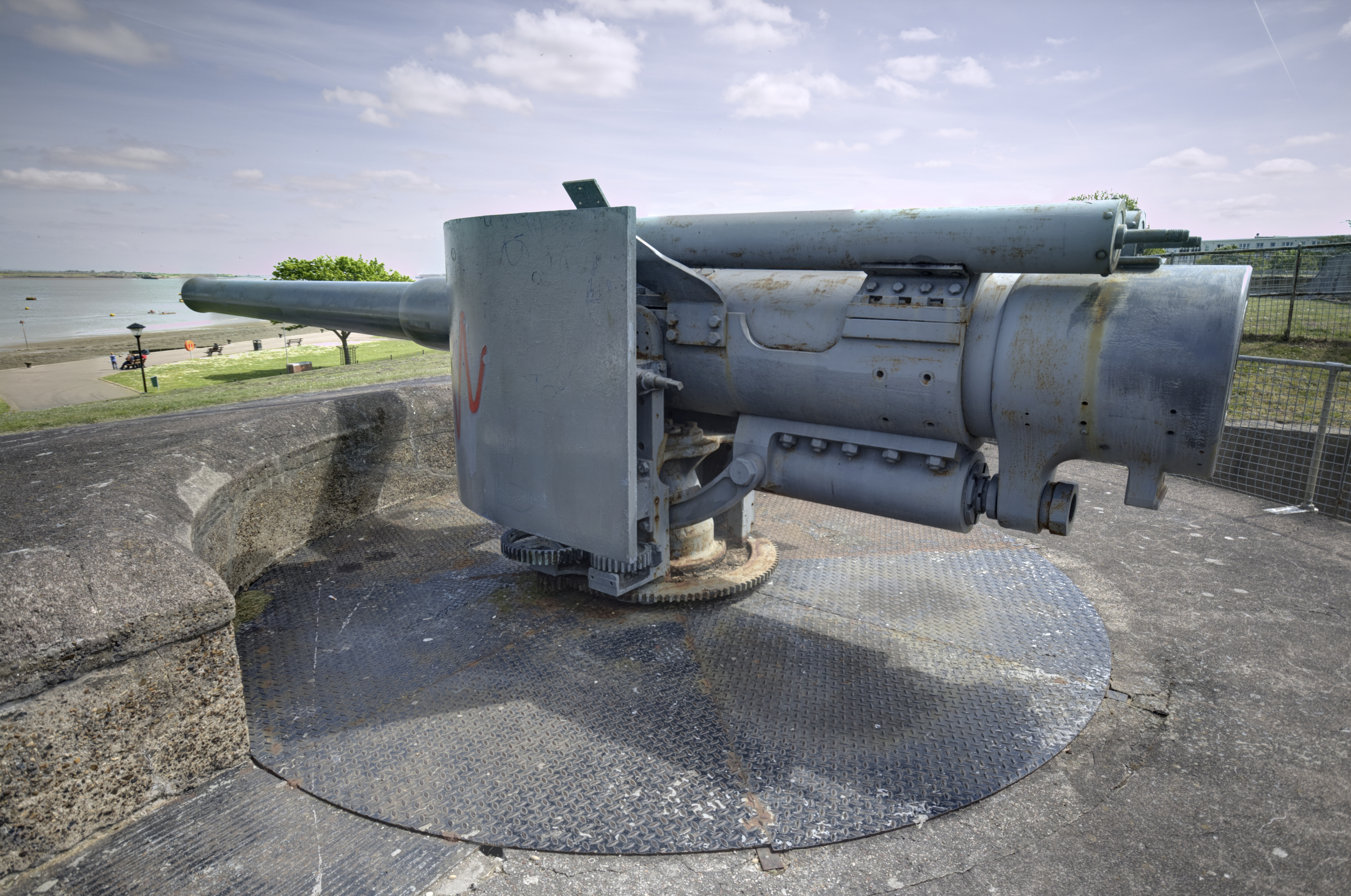
6-inch breech-loading gun of the same type that was installed in 1905

The fort had lost much of its importance by the turn of the 20th century. Advances in naval firepower meant that the principal line of defence for the Thames had been moved downriver to the batteries at Grain and Shoeburyness, where bigger guns with a longer range could control the entire estuary mouth. The old RML guns were now obsolete, while the emplacements provided little protection against modern naval artillery. A War Office report of 1887-8 commented that New Tavern Fort's "guns are crowded, and behind weak parapets; the parapets should be revised, and the number of guns reduced, so that they may be more effectively mounted." Proposals were advanced for this to be done and for the range of the guns to be extended by remounting them on modified carriages, but neither of these improvements were implemented.

In 1905 the RML emplacements were replaced with two concrete pits for a pair of 6-inch breech-loading guns with a range of 6 miles (9.7 km), with separate magazines constructed to support them. They were only emplaced for a few years and the fort was disarmed before the outbreak of the First World War in 1914 and was rearmed in 1930 with a pair of replacement 6-inch guns, used to train the Territorial Army's Gravesend battery. At the same time, the Gravesend Corporation purchased the interior of the fort. The interior of the fort was opened to the public in 1932 as a pleasure garden, though the battery remained in use until 1938. Some of the fort's internal structures were also demolished at this time.

Although it was no longer armed, New Tavern Fort continued to serve military purposes during the Second World War. A pair of 20-metre-high (66 ft) communications masts were built on top of the disused magazines to support a naval radio monitoring station. Oral testimony suggests that the station was used to intercept enemy radio communications which were taken to Bletchley Park for decryption. The Admiralty requisitioned the magazines in 1941 to utilise them and the connecting tunnels as air raid shelters for HMS Gordon, a naval shore establishment based in the nearby Sea School.

Following the war, the fort was reopened to the public as a garden. Fort House, the Commanding Royal Engineer's residence, was so badly damaged by a nearby V-2 rocket strike in 1944 that it had to be demolished; part of the Milton Chantry complex was also demolished in 1948. The Chantry's chapel was reused as Gravesend Historical Society's museum of local history from 1953 to 1970. In 1969, much of the rest of the Chantry was demolished. The remainder was taken into state guardianship in 1972 and became a heritage centre operated by Gravesham Borough Council.

=== Today ===
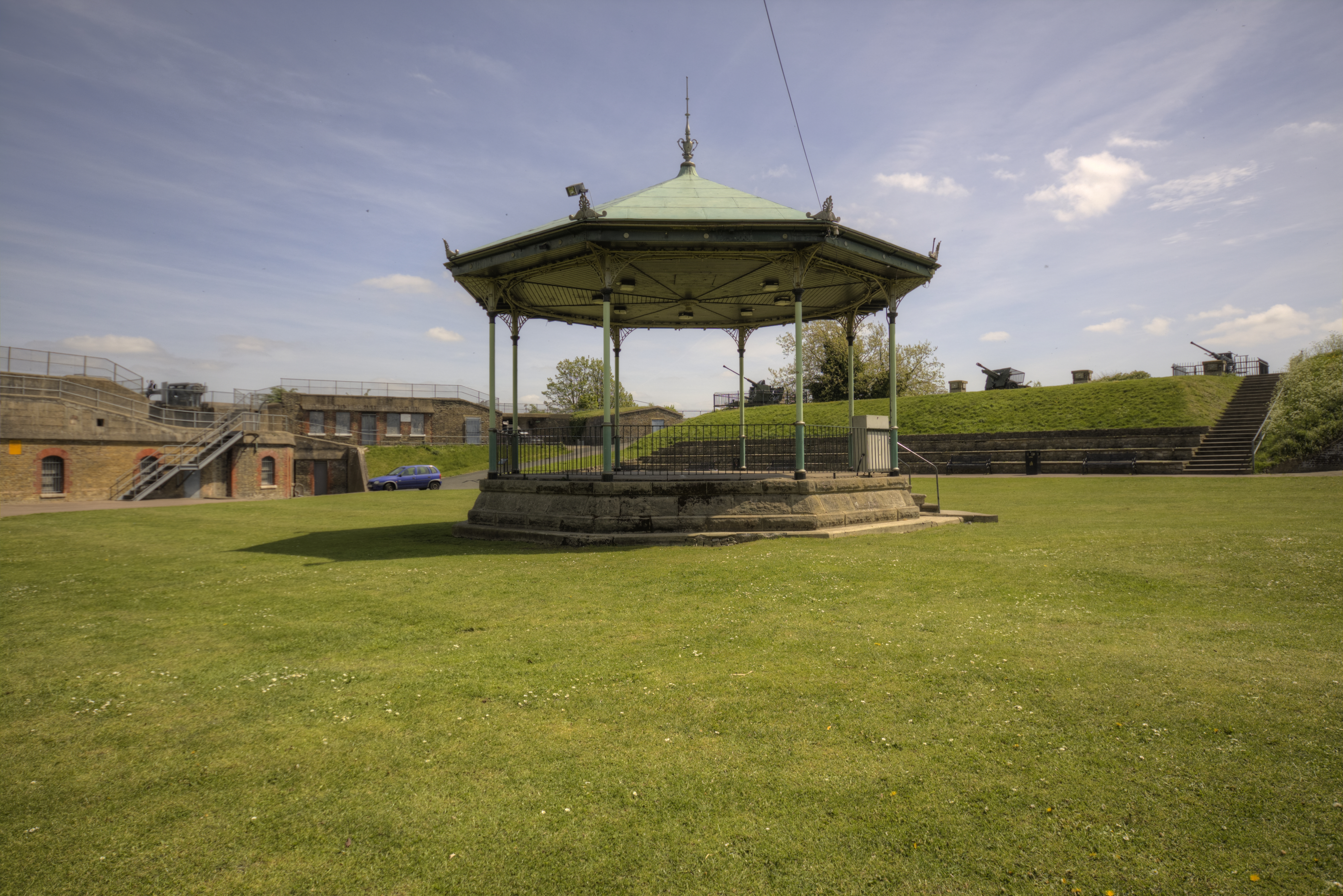
Bandstand and lawns within the ramparts of New Tavern Fort

Today the fort forms part of Gravesham Borough Council's Riverside Leisure Area. Its surface area is open all year round and the restored magazines are opened on summer weekends by a local heritage group. Restoration got underway in 1975, and in 1977 the fort was given a Grade II* listing for its architectural and historic interest, reflecting the unusual complete example that it presents.

Two salvaged 6-inch guns were reinstalled in the fort in the 1980s, making it the only completely armed two-gun battery of its type in the UK mainland. The magazines have also been refurbished and re-equipped to an extent that is unique in the UK. The fort's display of guns and emplacements dating from the 18th to the 20th century is also unique.
