= Mersea Fort =

Artillery fort in the East Mersea, UK

- East Mersea, Essex, England

Site information
- Type: Device Fort
- Open to the public: Yes
- Condition: Ruined

Location
- Shown within Essex
- Coordinates: 51°47′48″N 1°00′12″E

Site history
- Built: 1543
- Materials: Earth
- Events: Second English Civil War

Mersea Fort, also known as Cudmore Grove Blockhouse, was an artillery fort established by Henry VIII on the East Mersea coast in 1543. It formed part of the King's Device programme to protect against invasion from France and the Holy Roman Empire, and defended the River Colne that led to the town of Colchester. It was triangular in shape, with earthwork walls and three bastions to hold artillery. It was demobilised in 1552, but was brought back into use several times over the next century and saw service during the Second English Civil War of 1648. The fort hosted an admiralty court to oversea the local oyster trade, until the dilapidation of the site forced the court to move to the Moot Hall in Colchester in the middle of the 18th century. A new gun battery was built at the fort during the Napoleonic Wars, but the fortification then fell into decline and was extensively damaged by the construction of a sea wall along the coast. The remains of the earthworks were excavated by archaeologists between 2002 and 2003.

== History ==
=== 16th – 17th centuries ===
Mersea Fort was built as a consequence of international tensions between England, France and the Holy Roman Empire in the final years of the reign of King Henry VIII. Traditionally the Crown had left coastal defences to local lords and communities, only taking a modest role in building and maintaining fortifications, and while France and the Empire remained in conflict, maritime raids were common but an actual invasion of England seemed unlikely. Modest defences based around simple blockhouses and towers existed in the south-west and along the Sussex coast, with a few more impressive works in the north of England, but in general the fortifications were limited in scale.

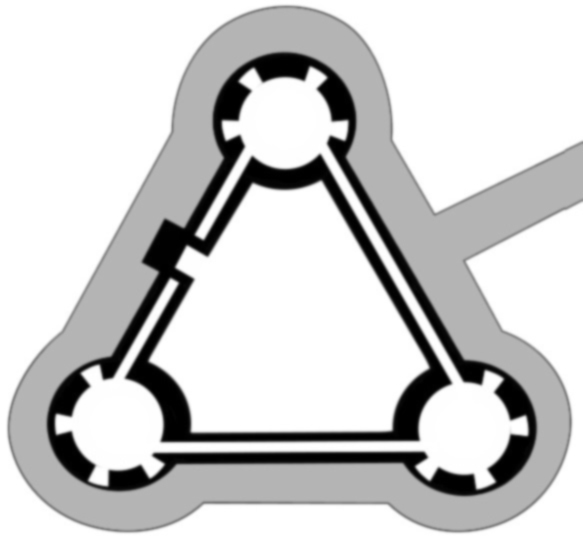
Simplified plan of the fort

In 1533, Henry broke with Pope Paul III over the annulment of his long-standing marriage to Catherine of Aragon. Catherine was the aunt of Charles V, the Holy Roman Emperor, who took the annulment as a personal insult. This resulted in France and the Empire declaring an alliance against Henry in 1538, and the Pope encouraging the two countries to attack England. An invasion of England appeared certain. In response, Henry issued an order, called a "device", in 1539, giving instructions for the "defence of the realm in time of invasion" and the construction of forts along the English coastline.

The county of Essex was not a priority for new investment, but the town of Harwich was reinforced in 1539 and further new fortifications, including Mersea Fort, were built along the coast in 1543, under the direction of Richard Lee and Richard Cawarden, at an estimated total cost of £2,717. (Note: Comparing early modern costs and prices with those of the modern period is challenging. £2,717 in 1543 could be equivalent to between £1.26 million and £601 million, depending on the price comparison used. For comparison, the total royal expenditure on all the Device Forts across England between 1539 and 1547 came to £376,500, with St Mawes and Sandgate Castle, for example, costing £5,018 and £5,584 apiece.) The fort was positioned on salt marshland on the south side of the River Colne, and would have protected the entrance to the estuary, working together with the new blockhouses built at St Osyth and Brightlingsea. Mersea was triangular, with earthwork walls between approximately 300 feet (91 m) long, further protected by "maunds", round baskets filled with earth, and a defensive ditch with a drawbridge. On each of the three corners was a circular bastion housing up to four guns. Buildings in the courtyard would have housed the garrison, which comprised a captain, a lieutenant, two soldiers, a porter and between three and six artillery gunners. There was a nearby jetty, probably for use by the fort.

In 1552 the fort was decommissioned, but was subsequently recommissioned by Mary I. In addition to the fort's military role, it hosted a court to oversee the oysterfields along the East Mersea coast, which were particularly lucrative but at risk of overfishing. In 1566, Colchester introduced new rules to govern the oyster trade, which were enforced by an admiralty court, held when necessary in Mersea Fort; the location was chosen so as to demonstrate the town's authority all the way up to the top of the estuary. A survey in 1586 showed the fort had been abandoned by the military once again: the defences were in a poor state, the guns' barrels were clogged with dirt and the site had been occupied by an elderly woman. It was brought back into use in 1588 and 1631 to defend against first the Spanish Armada and then the Dunkirker privateers.

==== English Civil War and Interregnum ====
During the First English Civil War between the supporters of King Charles I and Parliament, Mersea Fort saw no action; after the victory of Parliament in 1646, the fort's garrison was demobilised. Conflict flared again in 1648 with the outbreak of the Second English Civil War, and Colchester was taken by the Royalists. The town was immediately besieged by General Thomas Fairfax, who quickly seized Mersea Fort, which controlled the supply route by river into Colchester, before the Royalists could do so. The fort had contained five pieces of artillery: two culverins, two sakers and one drake. A Royalist raiding party of 300 soldiers was sent to recapture the fort, but without success.

Mersea Fort was placed under the command of Captain William Burrell. Guns and ammunition were kept there in case of a fresh rebellion, with a garrison of 36 men, which was temporarily reinforced by an additional squadron of horsemen and 50 foot soldiers in July 1650. Repairs were made from 1651 onwards, and new accommodation was constructed for the fort's gunners. After an invasion scare in 1655, Mersea was temporarily used to imprison Royalists suspected of planning an insurgency against Oliver Cromwell's Commonwealth government. The fort was then demobilised by Cromwell as part of his efforts to reduce defence costs; Burrell was ordered to dismantle the fort but the order was never carried out, partially because of the practical difficulties and because of opposition from the owner of the land. The admiralty court continued to be held in the fort, although it proved much harder to enforce the fishery rules because of the political turmoil.

=== 18th – 21st centuries ===
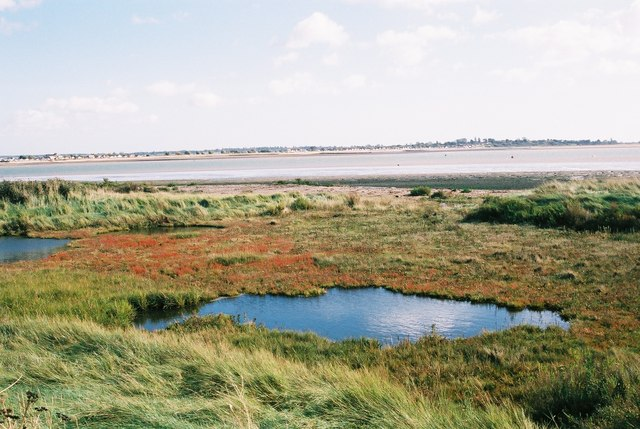
The marshland around the fort, overlooking the estuary and Brightlingsea

By the 18th century, Mersea Fort was in ruins. The fishery rules were reinforced by fresh legislation in 1758, which created a court of conservancy to oversea the oyster stocks. Officially, this court was supposed to sit at the fort, but rather than using the now dilapidated earthworks, it began to meet in Colchester's Moot Hall. Instead, a ceremony began to take place each year at the Mersea Stone, near to the fort, involving local dignitaries and extensive eating and drinking. The fort was recommissioned during the Napoleonic Wars at the start of the 19th century, and a new gun battery was constructed overlooking the sea, equipped with six 24-pounder (10.9 kg) guns. After this the fort was abandoned once again. A sea wall was built along the coast early in the century, cutting through the south-east side of the fort. The legislation on oysters was reformed by Parliament in 1870, which disbanded the previous court structure and severed the historic link with Mersea Fort. A defensive pill-box was constructed at the castle during the Second World War.

In the 21st century, the remains of the site are protected under UK law as a scheduled monument. The site was surveyed in 1982 and excavations were carried out between 2002 and 2003, analysing surviving timber structures that had been exposed by coastal erosion.

== Bibliography ==
- Biddle, Martin; Hiller, Jonathon; Scott, Ian; Streeten, Anthony (2001). Henry VIII's Coastal Artillery Fort at Camber Castle, Rye, East Sussex: An Archaeological Structural and Historical Investigation. Oxford, UK: Oxbow Books. ISBN 0-904220-23-0.
- Colvin, H. M.; Ransome, D. R.; Summerson (1982). The History of the King's Works, Volume 4: 1485–1660, Part 2. London, UK: HMSO. ISBN 0-11-670832-8.
- Fautley, M. P. B.; Garon, J. H. (2005) [2004]. Essex Coastline: Then and Now (2nd ed.). Winterbourne Down, UK: Potton Publishing. ISBN 978-0-9548010-0-7.
- Hale, J. R. (1983). Renaissance War Studies. London, UK: Hambledon Press. ISBN 0-907628-17-6.
- Harrington, Peter (2007). The Castles of Henry VIII. Oxford, UK: Osprey Publishing. ISBN 978-1-4728-0380-1.
- King, D. J. Cathcart (1991). The Castle in England and Wales: An Interpretative History. London, UK: Routledge Press. ISBN 978-0-415-00350-6.
- Morley, B. M. (1976). Henry VIII and the Development of Coastal Defence. London, UK: Her Majesty's Stationery Office. ISBN 0-11-670777-1.
- Thompson, M. W. (1987). The Decline of the Castle. Cambridge, UK: Cambridge University Press. ISBN 1-85422-608-8.
- Walton, Steven A. (2010). "State Building Through Building for the State: Foreign and Domestic Expertise in Tudor Fortification". Osiris. 25 (1): 66–84. doi:10.1086/657263. S2CID 144384757.
