= List of Device Forts =

Henrician castles Henrician blockhouses and bulwarks

The Device Forts, also known as Henrician castles and blockhouses, were a series of artillery fortifications built to defend the coast of England and Wales by Henry VIII. (Note: In the 16th century, a variety of terms were used to describe these fortifications, including "blockhouses", "bulwarks", "castles" and "fortresses". Modern historians have also used different terms to describe and analyse the fortifications: B. Morley, for example, distinguishes between "Henrician castles" and "Henrician blockhouses"; Peter Harrington between the "castles/forts" and "blockhouses"; Andrew Saunders distinguishes between the "castles", "forts" and "blockhouses", but stresses the breadth of the Device programme across England and Wales.) They ranged from large stone castles, to small blockhouses and earthwork bulwarks. Armed with artillery, the forts were intended to be used against enemy ships before they could land forces or attack vessels lying in harbour. The castles were commanded by captains appointed by the Crown, overseeing small garrisons of professional gunners and soldiers, who would be supplemented by local militia in an emergency. The Device programme was hugely expensive, costing a total of £376,000, much of it raised from the proceeds of the Dissolution of the Monasteries. (Note: Comparing 16th-century costs and prices with those of the modern period depends on the price comparison used. £376,000 in 1546 could be worth between £2,159 million and £67,260 million in 2015 terms, depending on the measure used.)

The fate of the Device Forts over the coming years varied. Some of the defences were left to deteriorate and were decommissioned only a few years after their construction. Others were kept in service and used during the English Civil War, the Anglo-Dutch Wars, the Napoleonic Wars and, upgraded with more modern artillery and defences, throughout the 19th century. By 1900, however, developments in guns and armour had made most of the Device Forts that remained in service simply too small to be practical in modern coastal defence. Despite being brought back into use during the Second World War, by the 1950s those fortifications still in use were considered redundant and finally decommissioned. Coastal erosion over the centuries had extensively damaged or completely destroyed some sites, but others have been restored and opened to the public as tourist attractions.

== Details ==
Name	Image	Plan	Location	Date	Built to protect	Open to the public	Notes
Brightlingsea Blockhouse			Brightlingsea; 51.805412°N 1.010532°E; TM076161	1543	River Colne	N/A	The blockhouse was an earthwork fort with a garrison of two officers and up to six men, which operated in partnership with St Osyth Blockhouse. It was decommissioned in 1552 and the site has since been lost, probably due to coastal erosion.
Brownsea Castle			Brownsea Island; 50.68834°N 1.95826°W; SZ029876	1545–47	Poole Harbour	No	The castle comprised a stone blockhouse with an adjacent, hexagonal gun platform, garrisoned by the local town with six soldiers and armed with eight artillery pieces. It was occupied by Parliament during the English Civil War, and was turned into a country house during the 18th century. It is now a corporate hotel for the John Lewis Partnership.
Calshot Castle			Calshot Spit; 50.82°N 1.3075°W; SU488024	1539–40	Southampton Water	Yes	The castle had a keep at its centre, surrounded by a curtain wall and a moat. Initially heavily armed, it had a garrison of 16 men and as many as 36 artillery guns. The castle became a base for seaplanes in 1913, and, as RAF Calshot, remained active until its closure in 1961. After a short period of use by the coastguard, the castle was opened to the public by English Heritage in the 1980s.
Camber Castle			Rye; 50.93305°N 0.73248°E; TQ919184	1513–43	Camber anchorage	Yes	The castle was rebuilt on the site of a previous tower in 1539, and expanded further from 1542 to 1543. The result was a large, concentric fort, with a central keep, surrounded by five circular bastions, built from stone and brick. It may have seen service in 1545 when a French fleet attacked the coast. The coastline receded, eventually placing it well in-land and the castle was closed in 1637.
Deal Castle			Deal; 51.21854°N 1.4039°E; TR376521	1539-40	The Downs	Yes	The castle comprised a keep with six inner and outer bastions, and had sixty-six firing positions for artillery. During the Second English Civil War, it was seized by pro-Royalist insurgents and retaken by Parliamentary forces only after several months' fighting. Deal was adapted during the 18th and 19th centuries to form a private house for the castle's captain and was decommissioned in 1904. It was restored by the government during the 1950s as a tourist attraction.
Devil's Point Artillery Tower			Plymouth; 50.35980°N 4.16719°W; SX459533	1537–39	Plymouth Harbour	No	The tower was built by the local Edgcumbe family, and comprised a one-storey, octagonal granite stone blockhouse, with six gunports overlooking the sea and the land.
East Blockhouse			Angle; 51.68213°N 5.12424°W; SM841027	1539	Milford Haven Waterway	Yes	The blockhouse was never completed, although its remains were used as a defensive site in the Second World War. Some of the site has been lost due to coastal erosion.
East Cowes Castle			East Cowes; 50.76657°N 1.2765°W; SZ511965	1539–42	Cowes Harbour and the River Medina	N/A	The castle probably comprised a circular bastion and a square tower. It was abandoned around 1546-47 and fell into ruin. Nothing survives of the site, which was probably finally destroyed by coastal erosion.
East Tilbury Blockhouse			East Tilbury; 51.46502°N 0.4328°E; TQ691761	1539–41	River Thames	N/A	The blockhouse was probably D-shaped, with a circular bastion facing the river and additional battery positions on both sides of the main defences, built using stone and timber taken from St Margaret's Chantry. The guns were removed in 1553 and it had probably fallen out of use by 1588. Coalhouse Fort was later built just inshore from the blockhouse, which may still survive under the Thames mud.
Gravesend Blockhouse			Gravesend; 51.44463°N 0.37277°E; TQ649744	1539	River Thames	No	The blockhouse was probably D-shaped, two storeys tall, with a circular bastion facing the river. There were lines of gun positions on both sides of the main defences. It was repaired in 1588 and 1667 due to the threat of Spanish and Dutch attack. The blockhouse was demolished in 1844.
Great Turf Bulwark			Deal; 51.232089°N 1.4020357°E; TR376536	1540	The Downs	N/A	The bulwark comprised an earthwork defence, forming part of a chain between Sandown and Walmer Castle, linked by a trench or a covered way. It was designed by Stephen Haschenperg. By 1547, the bulwark was defaced and the guns had been removed; it was formally removed from service in 1550. The site has since been lost.
Great White Bulwark of Clay			Deal; 51.212342°N 1.4005788°E; TR376514	1540	The Downs	N/A	The bulwark comprised an earthwork defence, forming part of a chain between Sandown and Walmer Castle, linked by a trench or a covered way. It was designed by Stephen Haschenperg. By 1547, the bulwark was defaced and the guns had been removed; it was formally removed from service in 1550. The site has since been lost.
Harwich blockhouses			Harwich; 51.94822°N 1.28707°E; TM259328	1543	Harwich	N/A	Three blockhouses were constructed, Tower House, Middle House and the House-upon-the-Hill, each with garrisons of two officers and between six and nine men. They were decommissioned in 1552, and, by 1588, two had been pulled down by a local citizen. The site of House-upon-the-Hill has since been lost to coastal erosion.
Higham Blockhouse			Higham; 51.45243°N 0.44695°E; TQ701754	1539	River Thames	N/A	The blockhouse was probably D-shaped, with a circular bastion facing the river. There were probably additional battery positions on both sides of the main defences. In 1553, orders were issued for its guns to be removed; it was then demolished between 1557 and 1558.
Hull Castle and blockhouses			Kingston upon Hull; 53.74339°N 0.326679°W; TA103287	1543	Kingston upon Hull	N/A	The castle comprised two large, curved bastions, with a rectangular keep at its centre; the blockhouses to its north and south had three curved bastions supporting guns, and a curtain wall and moat linked the blockhouses and castle. The town took over responsibility for these defences in 1553, which were used to imprison Catholic recusants, and saw military service during the English Civil War. The buildings were incorporated into a larger fortification called the Citadel in the 1680s and were demolished with it in 1864.
Hurst Castle			Hurst Spit; 50.70644°N 1.55117°W; SZ318897	1541–44	The Solent	Yes	The castle had a central keep, surrounded by three circular bastions, and was one of the most powerful forts along the coast. It was modernised to hold heavier guns at the start of the 19th century and during the 1850s. Two long wings for massive 12.5 inch, 38 ton (317 mm, 39,000 kg) rifled muzzle-loading guns were added in the 1860s. It was decommissioned in 1956, and is now owned by English Heritage.
Langar Point			Felixstowe; 51.93867°N 1.32083°E; TM284318	1540	Harwich	N/A	An earthwork fort with a garrison of two officers and up to six men, positioned on the shore. Plans were made for a replacement stone blockhouse, similar to Southsea Castle, in 1543 but the work was not carried out. It was decommissioned in 1552. Further plans were made for a bulwark at the site in 1588, but it is unclear what work, if any, was carried out. Landguard Fort was later built on the point.
Langar Rode			Felixstowe; 51.95992°N 1.31458°E; TM276340	1543	Harwich	N/A	An earthwork fort with a garrison of two officers and up to six men, positioned on higher ground. It was decommissioned in 1552.
Little Dennis Blockhouse			Falmouth; 50.14407°N 5.04210°W; SW827315	1540-45	Carrick Roads	Yes	The blockhouse was built as part of the wider defences of Pendennis Castle, comprising a stone, D-shaped building. It was decommissioned in 1654.
Little Turf Bulwark			Deal; 51.225806°N 1.4015720°E; TR376529	1540	The Downs	N/A	The bulwark comprised an earthwork defence, forming part of a chain between Sandown and Walmer Castle, linked by a trench or a covered way. It was designed by Stephen Haschenperg. By 1547, the bulwark was defaced and the guns had been removed; it was formally removed from service in 1550. The site has since been lost.
Mersea Fort			Mersea Island; 51.79674°N 1.00343°E; TM071151	1543	River Colne	Yes	The fort was triangular in shape, with earthwork walls and three bastions to hold artillery. It was demobilised in 1552, but was brought back into use several times over the next century, including during the Second English Civil War of 1648. The fort hosted an admiralty court to oversea the local oyster trade, but fell into decline and was extensively damaged by coastal erosion and the construction of a sea wall.
Milton Blockhouse			Milton-next-Gravesend; 51.44348°N 0.38008°E; TQ655742	1539	River Thames	N/A	The blockhouse was probably D-shaped, two storeys tall, with a circular bastion facing the river. There were probably additional battery positions on both sides of the main defences. In 1553, orders were issued for its guns to be removed; it was then demolished between 1557 and 1558.
Netley Castle			Netley; 50.87732°N 1.35981°W; SU451088	1542–45	Southampton Water	No	The castle had a central, stone keep with two flanking gun platforms and was garrisoned by ten men. It was decommissioned during the English Civil War, but in the 19th century it was renovated to form a private house. It was used as a nursing home between 1939 and 1998, before being converted into residential flats.
Pendennis Castle			Falmouth; 50.14609°N 5.04659°W; SW824317	1540–5	Carrick Roads	Yes	The castle had a circular keep and gun platform, which was expanded at the end of the 16th century with a ring of extensive ramparts and bastions. Pendennis saw service during the English Civil War and was besieged in 1646. It was modernised and upgraded in the 1730s and again during the 1790s, and was used during both world wars. It was decommissioned in 1956 and is now managed by English Heritage as a tourist attraction, receiving 74,230 visitors in 2011-12.
Portland Castle			Portland; 50.56823°N 2.44678°W; SY684743	1539–40	Portland Roads	Yes	The fan-shaped castle comprises a curved central tower and a gun battery, flanked by two angular wings. During the English Civil War, it survived two sieges before finally surrendering to Parliament in 1646. It continued in use as a fort until the end of the Napoleonic Wars in 1815, when it was disarmed, being variously used as a private house, military accommodation and storage until being opened to the public in 1955.
St Andrew's Castle			Hamble-le-Rice; 50.85145°N 1.32091°W; SU479059	1543–44	Southampton Water	Yes	The castle comprised a keep with a circular bastion, surrounded by a moat. A survey of 1559 showed it to be heavily armed. In the English Civil War it was occupied by Parliamentary forces who decommissioned it; most of the castle has been destroyed by the sea and only a few parts of the stonework survive.
St Catherine's Castle			Fowey; 50.32822°N 4.64444°W; SX118510	Circa 1538–40	Fowey Harbour	Yes	The castle comprised a two-storey, D-shaped blockhouse, and was built, and possibly partly paid for, by Thomas Treffry, a member of the local gentry. It was decommissioned in 1815, brought back into service in 1855, decommissioned again and finally served as a naval battery in the Second World War.
St Helens Bulwark			Isle of Wight; 50.70604°N 1.09834°W; SZ637899	Circa 1539–45	St Helens anchorage	N/A	The fort may have been captured by the French during their raid of 1545. There is no mention of it after 1660; a coastal artillery battery was built on top of the site in the 19th century and no trace now remains.
St Mawes Castle			Falmouth; 50.15544°N 5.02371°W; SW841327	1540-42	Carrick Roads	Yes	The castle comprised a four-storey central tower and three, protruding round bastions, operating in conjunction with Pendennis Castle. It was taken in the English Civil War by a Parliamentary army without a fight, but remained in use through the 18th and 19th centuries, being updated for modern weaponry. Disarmed in the early 20th century, it was briefly brought back into use during the Second World War.
St Osyth Blockhouse			St Osyth; 51.80101°N 1.01971°E; TM083156	1543	River Colne	N/A	The blockhouse was an earthwork fort with a garrison of two officers and up to six men, which operated in conjunction with Brightlingsea Blockhouse. It was decommissioned in 1552; a 19th-century Martello Tower may have been built over the site.
Sandown Castle			Sandown; 50.65669°N 1.14691°W; SZ605846	1545	The Solent	N/A	The castle was constructed from stone with angular bastions. Its design was a hybrid of Italian and English military designs. The site was raided by a French force while the fortification was still being constructed. The castle suffered from coastal erosion and was demolished in 1631.
Sharpenrode Bulwark			Freshwater; 50.70669°N 1.52145°W; SZ339898	1545–47	The Needles Passage	N/A	The earthen fort comprised a square blockhouse with two angular bastions. Its design expressed some early Italianate concepts. It was extensively rebuilt in 1587, and in the 1850s Fort Victoria was constructed over the site.
Sandsfoot Castle			Weymouth; 50.59535°N 2.46099°W; SY674773	Completed by 1541	Weymouth Bay	Yes	The castle comprised a blockhouse attached to an octagonal gun room, overlooking the sea; further earthwork defences were added, probably in 1623. It changed hands several times during the English Civil War, and was taken out of active service in 1665. It suffered badly from erosion, and by the 1950s the gun room had collapsed into the sea.
Sandgate Castle			Folkestone; 51.07353°N 1.14882°E; TR209352	1539–40	Kentish coast	No	The castle comprised a central stone keep, with three towers and a gatehouse. It was rebuilt in 1805 during the Napoleonic Wars, the keep becoming a Martello Tower. It suffered badly from coastal erosion, and was sold off into private ownership in 1888.
Sandown Castle			Deal; 51.23843°N 1.40222°E; TR375543	1539–40	The Downs	Yes	The castle comprised a keep and four circular bastions, covering 0.59 acres (0.24 ha). During the Second English Civil War it was seized by pro-Royalist insurgents. In the 19th century it was largely demolished by the military; the remaining masonry is now encased in concrete as part of a sea wall.
Southsea Castle			Portsmouth; 50.77811°N 1.08880°W; SZ643980	1544	The Solent	Yes	The castle comprised a keep, gun platforms and angled bastions, forming an early English example of the trace italienne-style of fortification. It saw brief action at the start of the English Civil War when it was stormed by Parliamentary forces. The castle was expanded in the 1680s by Sir Bernard de Gomme and was redesigned again during the Napoleonic Wars and throughout the 19th century. It was decommissioned in 1960.
Walmer Bulwark			Walmer; 51.206059°N 1.4001156°E; TR376507	1540	The Downs	N/A	Also known as the Black Bulwark, the bulwark comprised an earthwork defence, forming part of a chain of defences between Sandown and Walmer Castle, linked by a trench or a covered way. It was designed by Stephen Haschenperg. By 1547, the bulwark was defaced and the guns had been removed; it was formally removed from service in 1550. The site has since been lost.
Walmer Castle			Walmer; 51.20056°N 1.40203°E; TR377501	1539	The Downs	Yes	The castle comprised a keep and four circular bastions, covering 0.61 acres (0.25 ha). During the Second English Civil War, Walmer was seized by pro-Royalist insurgents and was only retaken by Parliamentary forces after several months' fighting. In the 18th century, Walmer became the official residence of the Lord Warden of the Cinque Ports and was gradually modified from a military fortification into a private residence, being decommissioned in 1904.
West Blockhouse			Dale; 51.68830°N 5.15790°W; SM818036	1539	Milford Haven Waterway	N/A	The blockhouse was described by contemporaries as comprising a round tower, with eight gunports. It was destroyed in the 19th century to make way for the West Blockhouse Fort.
West Cowes Castle			Cowes; 50.76653°N 1.30111°W; SZ493965	1539	River Medina	No	The castle comprised a circular bastion, flanking wings and a keep. It very briefly saw action during the English Civil War and was decommissioned in 1854, becoming the Royal Yacht Squadron's new clubhouse. It formed the headquarters for part of the D-Day invasion force during the Second World War.
West Tilbury Blockhouse			Chadwell St Mary; 51.45238°N 0.37357°E; TQ651754	1539	River Thames	N/A	The blockhouse was D-shaped, with a circular bastion facing the river. There were probably additional battery positions on both sides of the main defences, an additional outer ditch and ramparts were constructed in 1588. It was controlled by Parliament during the English Civil War and used to control traffic along the Thames. The surrounding fort was hugely expanded after 1670 and the blockhouse itself was finally demolished in 1868.
Yarmouth Castle			Yarmouth; 50.70663°N 1.50016°W; SZ353897	1545	Yarmouth Harbour	Yes	The castle comprised a square artillery fort, built around a central courtyard with an angular bastion protecting the landward side. The bastion was a departure from earlier approaches and Yarmouth was the first to adopt this Italian-styled design in England. It remained in military and government use until the 1950s.

== Bibliography ==
- Ashton, Robert (1994). Counter-revolution: The Second Civil War and Its Origins, 1646–8. Avon, UK: The Bath Press. ISBN 9780300061147.
- Barrett, W. Bowles (1910). "Weymouth and Melcombe Regis in the Time of the Great Civil War". Proceedings of the Dorset Natural History and Antiquarian Field Club. 31: 204–229.
- Biddle, Martin; Hiller, Jonathon; Scott, Ian; Streeten, Anthony (2001). Henry VIII's Coastal Artillery Fort at Camber Castle, Rye, East Sussex: An Archaeological Structural and Historical Investigation. Oxford, UK: Oxbow Books. ISBN 0904220230.
- Brooks, Stephen (1996). Southsea Castle. Andover, UK: Pitkin Guides. ISBN 0-85372-809-7.
- Chandler, John (1996). "John Leland in the West Country". In Brayshay, Mark (ed.). Topographical Writers in South-West England. Exeter, UK: University of Exeter Press. pp. 34–49. ISBN 9780859894241.
- Chapple, Nick (2014). "A History of the National Collection: Volume Six, 1945-1953". Research Report Series. London, UK: English Heritage. ISSN 2046-9799.
- Coad, J. G. (1985). "Hurst Castle: The Evolution of a Tudor Fortress 1790-1945". Post-Medieval Archaeology. 19: 63–104. doi:10.1179/pma.1985.005.
- Coad, J. G. (1990). Hurst Castle, Hampshire (2nd ed.). London, UK: English Heritage. ISBN 1-85074-053-4.
- Coad, Jonathan (2000). Deal Castle, Kent. London, UK: English Heritage. ISBN 1850746974.
- Coad, Jonathan (2006). "Calshot Castle: The Later History of Tudor Fortress, 1793-1945". The English Heritage Historical Review. 1: 103–113. doi:10.1179/175201606797188516.
- Coad, Jonathan (2008). "History of the Castle". In Lawson, Susannah (ed.). Walmer Castle and Gardens. London, UK: English Heritage. pp. 24–36. ISBN 978-1-85074-726-0.
- Coad, Jonathan (2013). Calshot Castle: Hampshire (revised ed.). London, UK: English Heritage. ISBN 9781850741022.
- Colvin, H. M.; Ransome, D. R.; Summerson (1982). The History of the King's Works, Volume 4: 1485-1660, Part 2. London, UK: HMSO. ISBN 0116708328.
- Corney, Arthur (1968). Southsea Castle. Portsmouth, UK: Portsmouth City Council. OCLC 504812915.
- Crane, P. (2012). East Blockhouse, Angle: Archaeological Excavation, July 2011. Carmarthan, UK: Dyfed Archaeological Trust.
- Elvin, Charles R. S. (1890). Records of Walmer, Together with "The Three Castles that Keep the Downs". London, UK: Henry Gray. OCLC 4866519.
- Finley, Eric Gault (1994). RCN Beach Commando "W". Ottawa, Canada: Gilmore. OCLC 37489940.
- Fry, Sebastian (2014). "A History of the National Heritage Collection: Volume Two: 1900-1913". Research Report Series. London, UK: English Heritage. ISSN 2046-9799.
- Garnett, Oliver (2005) [1993]. Brownsea Castle (corrected ed.). Swindon, UK: The National Trust. ISBN 978-1-84359-110-8.
- Groves, T. B. (1879). "Notes on Sandsfoot Castle". Proceedings of the Dorset Natural History and Antiquarian Field Club. 3: 20–24.
- Hale, John R. (1983). Renaissance War Studies. London, UK: Hambledon Press. ISBN 0907628176.
- Harrington, Peter (2007). The Castles of Henry VIII. Oxford, UK: Osprey Publishing. ISBN 9781472803801.
- Harris, Edward C. (1980). "Archaeological Investigations at Sandgate Castle, Kent, 1976-9". Post-Medieval Archaeology. 14: 53–88. doi:10.1179/pma.1980.003.
- Hirst, Joseph H. (1895). "Castle of Kingston-upon-Hull". East Riding Antiquarian Society. 3: 24–39.
- Howes, Audrey; Foreman, Martin (1999). Town and Gun: The 17th-Century Defences of Hull. Kingston upon Hull, UK: Kingston Press. ISBN 1902039025.
- Jenkins, Stanley C. (2007). "St Mawes Castle, Cornwall". Fort. 35: 153–172.
- Kenyon, J. R. (1979). "An Aspect of the 1559 Survey of the Isle of Wight: The State of all the Quenes maties Fortresses and Castelles". Post-Medieval Archaeology. 13: 61–77. doi:10.1179/pma.1979.002.
- Lawson, Susannah (2002). Portland Castle: Dorset. London, UK: English Heritage. ISBN 9781850747253.
- Leland, John (1907). Smith, Lucy Toumlin (ed.). The Itinerary of John Leland In or About the Years 1535-1543. Vol. 1. London, UK: George Bell and Sons. OCLC 2858987.
- Lewis, T. Hayter (1884). "The Castles of Sandown and Sandgate". Journal of the British Archaeological Association. 40 (2): 173–178. doi:10.1080/00681288.1884.11887698.
- Morley, B. M. (1976). Henry VIII and the Development of Coastal Defence. London, UK: Her Majesty's Stationery Office. ISBN 0116707771.
- Norman, W. C. (1920). "Sandsfoot Castle, Weymouth". Proceedings of the Dorset Natural History and Antiquarian Field Club. 41: 34–38.
- O'Neill, B. H. St John (1985) [1966]. Deal Castle, Kent. London, UK: Historic Buildings and Monuments Commission for England. ISBN 1850740321.
- Pattison, Paul (2009). Pendennis Castle and St Mawes Castle. London, UK: English Heritage. ISBN 9781848020221.
- Rigold, S. E. (2012) [1978]. Yarmouth Castle, Isle of Wight (revised ed.). London, UK: English Heritage. ISBN 9781850740490.
- Rutton, W. L. (1893). "Sandgate Castle, AD 1539-40". Archaeologia Cantiana. 20: 228–257.
- Rutton, W. L. (1898). "Henry VIII's Castles at Sandown, Deal, Walmer, Sandgate, and Camber". 23: 24–30.
- Saunders, Andrew D. (1960). "Tilbury Fort and the Development of Artillery Fortifications in the Thames Estuary". The Antiquaries Journal. 40 (3–4): 152–174. doi:10.1017/s0003581500061928. S2CID 129086005.
- Saunders, Andrew (1989). Fortress Britain: Artillery Fortifications in the British Isles and Ireland. Liphook, UK: Beaufort. ISBN 1855120003.
- Smith, Victor T. C. (1974). "The Artillery Defences at Gravesend". Archaeologia Cantiana. 89: 141–168.
- Smith, Victor T. C. (1980). "The Milton Blockhouse, Gravesend: Research and Excavation". Archaeologia Cantiana. 96: 341–362.
- Spurgeon, J. P. G.; Brooke, J. (1996). "Use of the Contingent Evaluation Method to Quantify Some Aspects of the Environmental Effects of Coastal Defence Schemes". In Fleming, C. A. (ed.). Topographical Writers in South-West England. London, UK: Thomas Telford Publishing. pp. 118–131. ISBN 9780859894241.
- Sutcliffe, Sheila (1973). Martello Towers. Rutherford, US: Fairleigh Dickinson University Press. ISBN 9780838613139.
- Sydenham, John (1839). History of the Town and Country of Poole. Poole, UK: Sydenham. OCLC 5842224.
- Symonds, Henry (1914). "Sandsfoot and Portland Castles". Proceedings of the Dorset Natural History and Antiquarian Field Club. 35: 27–40.
- Tapete, Deodato; Bromhead, Edward; Ibsen, Maia; Casagli, Nicola (2013). "Coastal Erosion and Landsliding Impact on Historic Sites in SE Britain". In Margottini, Claudio; Canuti, Paolo; Sassa, Kyoji (eds.). Landslide Science and Practice: Volume 6, Risk Assessment, Management and Migitation edited by Claudio Margottini, Paolo Canuti, Kyoji Sassa. Heidelberg, Germany: Springer. pp. 451–458. ISBN 9783642313196.
- Thompson, D.; Smith, V. (1977). "The Excavation of the Gravesend Blockhouse". Archaeologia Cantiana. 93: 153–177.
- Walton, Steven A. (2010). "State Building Through Building for the State: Foreign and Domestic Expertise in Tudor Fortification". Osiris. 25 (1): 66–84. doi:10.1086/657263. S2CID 144384757.
