= Thomas Hyde Page =

British engineer and cartographer (1746–1821)

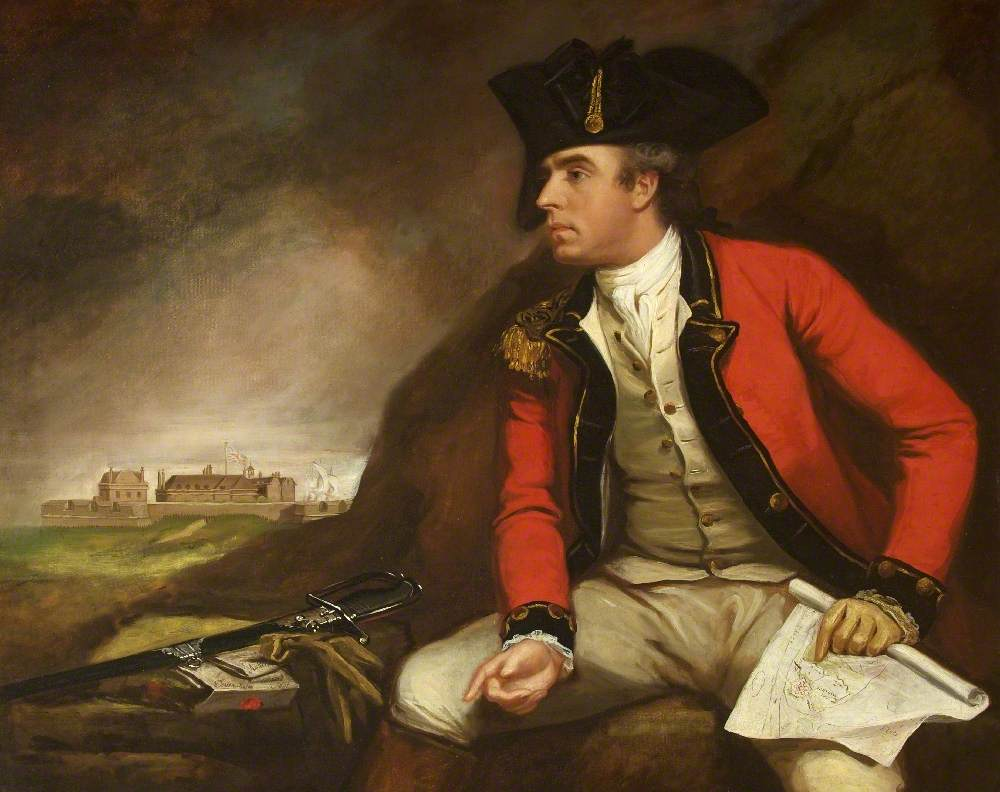
Painting of Page by James Northcote

Sir Thomas Hyde Page, FRS (1746–1821) was a British military engineer and cartographer for the British crown.

In 1777 he married Susanna, widow of Edmund Bastard of Kitley, Devon, and sister of Sir Thomas Crawley-Boevey, baronet. In 1783 he married Mary Albinia (d. 1794), daughter of John Woodward (formerly captain in the 70th regiment) of Ringwould, Kent, and they had five children. His third marriage, to Mary, widow of Captain Everett RN, was childless.

== Early life ==
He was born in Over Whitacre, Warwickshire England and was the son of Robert Hyde Page (d. 1764), also a military engineer, and Elizabeth, daughter of Francis Morewood of Arley, Warwicks.

Thomas Hyde Page attended the Royal Military Academy, Woolwich, receiving a gold medal from King George III.

== Career ==
In July 1769, Page was appointed as a practitioner engineer and second lieutenant in the Corps of Royal Engineers. Page was promoted sub-lieutenant and engineer in 1774.

In 1775, Lord George Townshend, 1st Marquess Townshend, master-general of the ordnance, asked Page 'to take a view of the Bedford Level' to improve the general drainage in the county. His report to Lord Townshend, dated 31 March 1775, was deposited in the library of the Institution of Civil Engineers.

He constructed a ferry in Chatham for which he won a gold medal from the Royal Society of Arts in 1775.

Page went with the corps of engineers to North America and distinguished himself in service to General Pigott at the Battle of Bunker Hill on 17 June 1775, where he was severely wounded. As a result of this disability, he received a pension of 10 shillings per day.

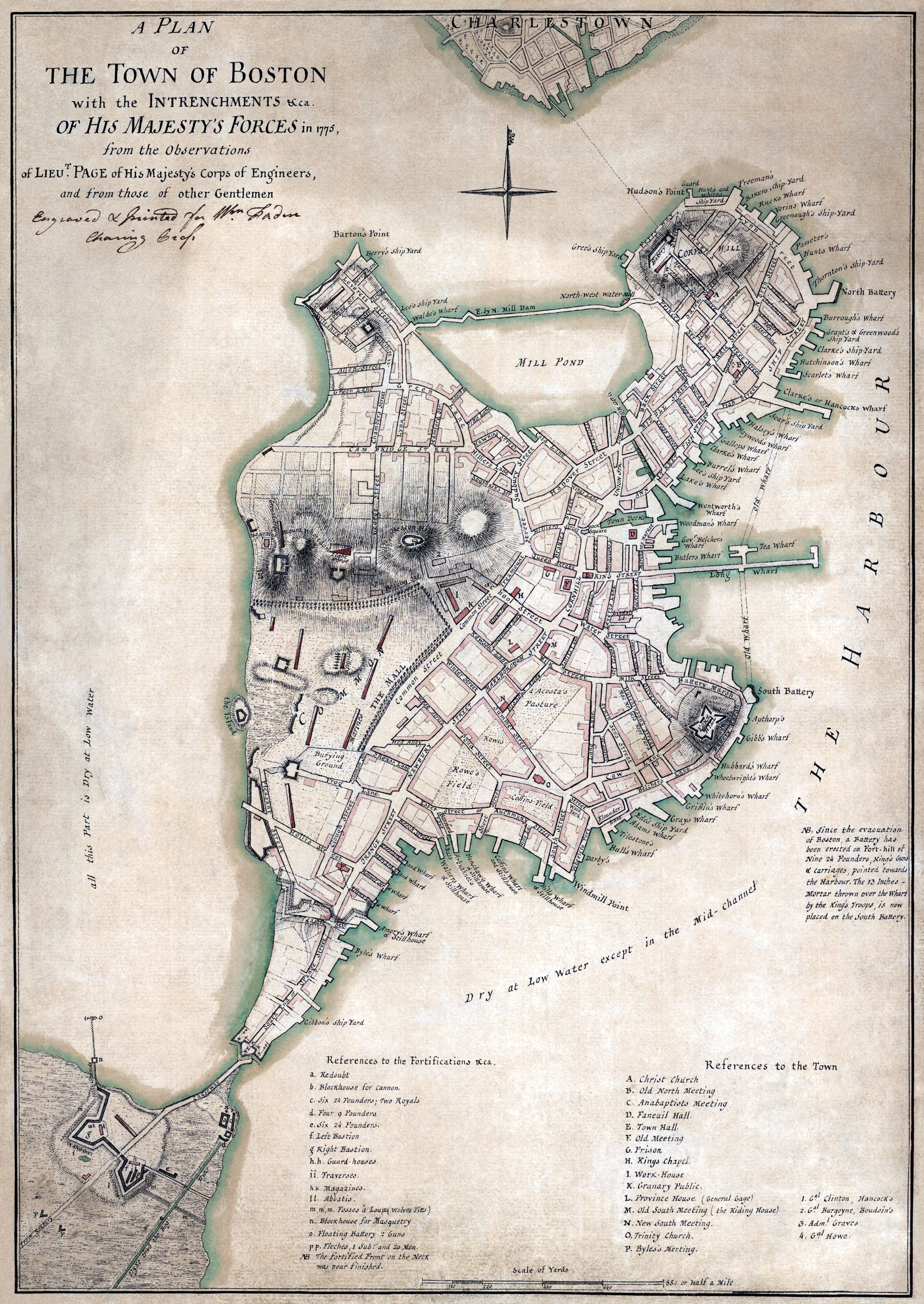
Map showing a British tactical evaluation of Boston in 1775 by Lieut. Thomas Hyde Page, His Majesty's Corps of Engineers

In England, for the next few years he was the commanding royal engineer of the eastern coastal district and supervised the refurbishment of defences at Dover, Chatham, Tilbury, Gravesend, Sheerness, and Landguard Fort. In 1780, he organised the Dover Volunteers.

In 1782 the Board of Ordnance commissioned him to bore a well at Sheerness garrison. He tried a new technique and the experiment failed, resulting in his being blamed. In the House of Commons the experiment was said to be 'not a well for fresh water, but a sink for the money of the public'.

Page made a second attempt in Fort Townshend at Sheerness which was successful. Page's report on making the Sheerness well is dated 12 May 1783 and plans and sections were published in the Philosophical Transactions of the Royal Society, 74.

In 1783, Page was a candidate for the Royal Society, supported by the mathematician Charles Hutton and others. He was made a Fellow of the Royal Society on 10 July 1783 being described as 'a gentleman well versed in mechanics and many other branches of experimental philosophy'.

He was knighted on 23 August 1783.

Page was promoted to captain-lieutenant in 1784 and made a captain on 20 April 1787, before being moved to the invalid engineers months later.

His expertise was still in demand and was made the chief consulting engineer in the improvement of the port of Dublin, of Wicklow harbour, of the inland navigation of Ireland, and of the Royal, Shannon and Newry canals. In 1792, he was the director for repairing the breach in the dock canal in Dublin.

Page also worked on forming the new cut ("The Eau Brink Cut") and channel from Eau Brinck (Eau Brink) to King's Lynn in Norfolk, England, and along the River Great Ouse, a problem of navigation and drainage that had baffled engineers since the time of King Charles I of England in the 17th century.

== Later years ==
Page married, and had children. His eldest daughter Mary Albinia (d. 1835) married Sir Thomas Crawley-Boevey, third baronet (1769–1847); his granddaughter Matilda Blanche Crawley-Boevey married businessman William Gibbs, both becoming religious philanthropists and supporters of the Oxford Movement.

Page lived for many years at Betshanger Park, Kent, but retired for reasons of health, abroad to France. He died in Boulogne, France on 30 June 1821, and was buried there.

== Selected works ==
- Page, Thomas Hyde, "Considerations upon the state of Dover-harbour, with its relative consequence to the navy of Great Britain ... To which is prefixed, a letter, addressed to the Military Association for the defence of the town and harbour of Dover", printed for the author, by Simmons and Kirkby, Canterbury : 1784
- Page, Thomas Hyde, "The reports or observations of Sir Thomas Hyde Page on the means of draining the south and middle levels of the Fens", Reprinted, [London ?] : 1794
- Page, Thomas Hyde; Mylne, Robert, Correspondence Upon The Subject Of The Eau-Brink Cut, Between Sir Thomas Hyde Page And Mr. Mylne: In The Years 1801 And 1802', Lynn, England : Andrew Pigge, 1802
