= Brockman =

Brockman may refer to:

== People ==
- Ann Brockman (1896–1943) American painter
- Ann Brockman (writer) (c.1600–1660) English writer on medicine
- Benjamin T. Brockman (1831–1864), American Confederate Army officer
- Brent Brockman (born 1988), American soccer player
- Cecil Brockman (born 1984), American politician
- Charles Samuel Brockman (1845–1923), Australian explorer
- Charlie Brockman (1927–2005), American sportscaster
- Craig Brockman (born 1973), American record producer
- Edward Lewis Brockman (1865–1943), British colonial administrator
- Edmund Ralph Brockman (1828–1908), Australian politician
- Edmund Vernon Brockman (1882–1938), Australian politician
- George Julius Brockman (1850–1912), Australian explorer
- Greg Brockman (born 1987), entrepreneur, investor and software engineer
- Helen Brockman (1902–2008), American fashion writer and designer
- Henry Brockman (colonist) (1622 or 1623 – c. 1690s), American colonist
- Jake Brockman (disambiguation), several people
- James Brockman (1886–1967), American songwriter
- John Brockman (disambiguation), several people
- Jon Brockman (born 1987), American basketball player
- Lani Brockman (born 1956), American actress
- Leigh Brockman (born 1978), Australian rules footballer
- Peter Brockman (disambiguation), several people
- Robert Brockman (1941–2022), American businessman
- Ronald Brockman (1909–1999), Royal Navy admiral
- Shimshon Brokman (born 1957), Israeli Olympic sailor
- Slade Brockman (born 1970), Australian Senator
- Tallulah Brockman Bankhead (1902–1968), American actress
- Thomas Patterson Brockman (1797–1859), American politician
- William Brockman (disambiguation), several people

Fictional characters

- Kent Brockman, a character on The Simpsons

== Places ==
- Brockman, California, an unincorporated community in Lassen County, California, United States
- Brockman Airport, an airport in Western Australia
- Brockman Building, a building in Los Angeles, California, United States
- Brockman Gallery (1967–1970) in Los Angeles, California
- Brockman Highway, a highway in Western Australia
- Brockman National Park, a national park in Western Australia
- Brockman River, a river in Western Australia
- Brockman 2 mine and Brockman 4 mine, mines in Western Australia

== See also ==
- Brockmann, name
- Kees Broekman, Dutch speed skater
