= Brockmann =

Brockmann is a name that can be used as a given name, middle name, or surname.

== People with the surname Brockmann ==
- Andreas Brockmann (born 1967), German field hockey player
- Anke Brockmann (born 1988), German field hockey player
- "Bassy" Bob Brockmann (born 1962), American record producer
- Dirk Brockmann (born 1969), German physicist
- Elena Brockmann (1867–1946), Swiss painter
- Gottfried Brockmann (1903–1983), German artist, professor
- H. Jane Brockmann, emeritus professor at the University of Florida
- Henrik Brockmann (born 1967), Danish heavy metal singer
- Hermanus Brockmann (1871–1936), Dutch coxswain
- Jens-Christoph Brockmann (born 1987), German politician
- Josef Müller-Brockmann, (1914–1996), Swiss graphic designer and teacher
- Julius von Raatz-Brockmann (1870–1944), German baritone singer
- Katya Brockmann (born 2006), Mexican American amateur rock climber
- Marie Brockmann-Jerosch (1877–1952), Swiss botanist
- Miguel d'Escoto Brockmann (1933–2017), American-born Nicaraguan diplomat, politician, and Catholic priest
- Nedd Brockmann, Australian ultramarathon athlete & motivational speaker
- Reiner Brockmann (1609–1647), German pastor
- Suzanne Brockmann (born 1960), American romantic fiction writer
- Tessa Johanna Brockmann (born 2005), German tennis player

== People with the middle name Brockmann ==
- Brock Long (born as William Brockmann Long, born 1975), American Administrator of the Federal Emergency Management Agency (FEMA)

== See also ==
- Brockmann body, endocrine organ
- Brockman (disambiguation)
- Gottfried Brockmann Prize, juried art prize awarded every two years in Kiel, Schleswig-Holstein, Germany
