= Drake-Brockman =

Drake-Brockman is a surname. Notable people with the surname include:

- Deborah Drake-Brockman (1887–1965), known as Lady Hackett or Lady Moulden, Australian community worker, philanthropist and mining investor
- Edmund Drake-Brockman CB, CMG, DSO (1884–1949), distinguished Australian soldier, statesman, and judge who served in both World War I and II
- Frederick Slade Drake-Brockman, (1857–1917), Surveyor General and explorer of Western Australia
- Geoffrey Drake-Brockman (artist) (born 1964), Australian artist well known for incorporating robotics and lasers into his work
- Geoffrey Drake-Brockman (engineer) (1885–1977), Western Australian civil engineer, and an Australian Army officer in both World Wars
- Grace Drake-Brockman (1860–1935), commonly referred to as Grace Bussell, a woman from Western Australia
- Henrietta Drake-Brockman (1901–1968), Australian journalist and novelist
- Sir Henry Vernon Drake-Brockman (1865–1933), British Indian civil servant
- Jake Drake-Brockman (1955–2009), Bristol-based English musician and sound recordist
- Tom Drake-Brockman DFC (1919–1992), Australian politician and Minister for Air

== See also ==
- Drake (disambiguation)
- Brockman (disambiguation)
