= Sir William Brockman =

English landowner and military leader

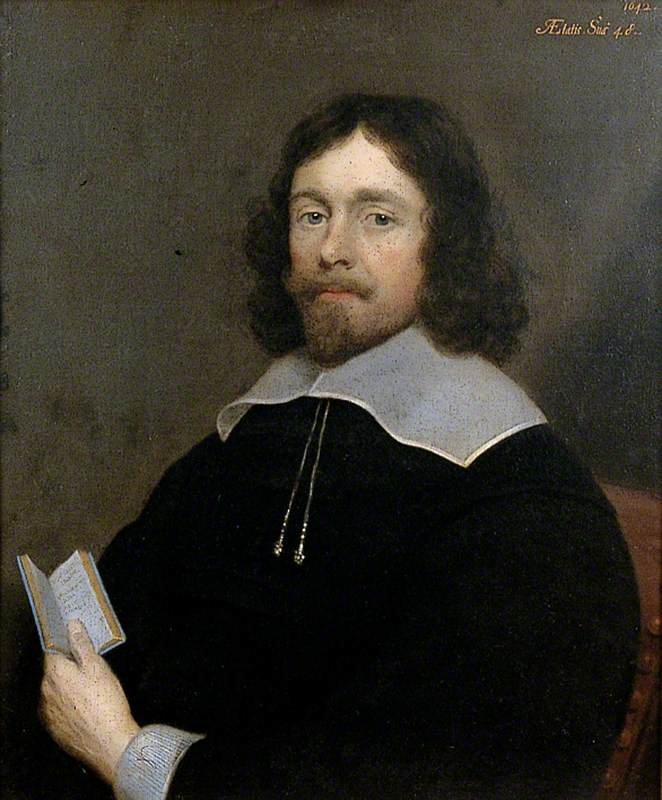
Sir William Brockman by Cornelius Johnson (1642)

Sir William Brockman (1595–1654) was an English landowner and military leader. He is best known for his staunch, if unsuccessful, defence of Maidstone in the Royalist cause, during the English Civil War.

== Early life ==
William Brockman was born in England in 1595, at Lyminge in Kent, the son of Henry Brockman and Helen (Sawkins). He was educated at Oxford University and married an heiress: Ann (Bunce), the only daughter of Dorothy and Simon Bunce, Esq., of Lynsted on 28 May 1616. The couple had seven children the first born son, Henry, and a daughter died in infancy. In 1632, William Brockman, Esq., was knighted by King Charles I.

== The Battle of Maidstone ==
On the outbreak of the Civil War, the recently knighted Sir William Brockman remained loyal to King Charles I and the Royalist cause. In 1642, Sir William was appointed High Sheriff of Kent by the King, but almost immediately he was arrested and imprisoned in Winchester Palace in Southwark, in London. The action seemed to have been a tactic to remove potentially influential Royalist supporters from the scene, and Brockman was replaced as Sheriff by Sir John Honeywood. William remained in custody until August 1645, although from June 1644 he transferred back to Kent, on the grounds that his health was deteriorating in the squalid London prison, to the fortified manor house known as Westenhanger Castle, only a couple of miles from his home at Beachborough.

In 1648, when the second period of conflict flared up, Sir William became directly involved in the fighting for the first and only time, under the command of Sir John Mayney. Separated from the main loyalist forces, the detachment in Maidstone had to fight unsupported against a large force of the New Model Army, under Sir Thomas Fairfax, or Lord Fairfax of Cameron as he had just become, having inherited the family peerage from the Kingdom of Scotland.

Fairfax marched on Maidstone, with his division of veteran troops, numbering approximately 6, 000 men. The garrison initially comprised approximately 1, 000 men, but some of these were apparently sailors and some were raw recruits. Lord Fairfax crossed the river at East Farleigh Bridge and prepared to storm the town. Meanwhile, the Royalist strength had been boosted by Sir William, who had managed to bring in a large force of reinforcements, numbering about 800 men, during the preliminary skirmishing. The assault began about seven o'clock that evening, in driving rain. The resistance of the townsmen was determined and the battle gradually spread out into every street. Royalists fought from hasty barricades in the streets and from the houses on either side. The conflict degenerated into house-to-house fighting. The battle continued in this way until midnight, still in rain, around which time the surviving Royalists were driven into a churchyard where they regrouped and prepared for the next phase. They were eventually persuaded to surrender on conditions that guaranteed their personal safety. Fairfax's report to Parliament confirms that Sir William and the other leaders were captured, and so began Sir William's second period of imprisonment.

In somewhat flowery prose, the 1836 edition of Burke's Commoners summed up the Battle of Maidstone as follows: "Few actions displayed more of that chivalric courage and devoted resolve which characterised the adherents of the King during the civil wars than this. Lord Clarendon terms it a sharp encounter very bravely fought with the general's whole strength".

=== The Battle Report of Lord Fairfax ===
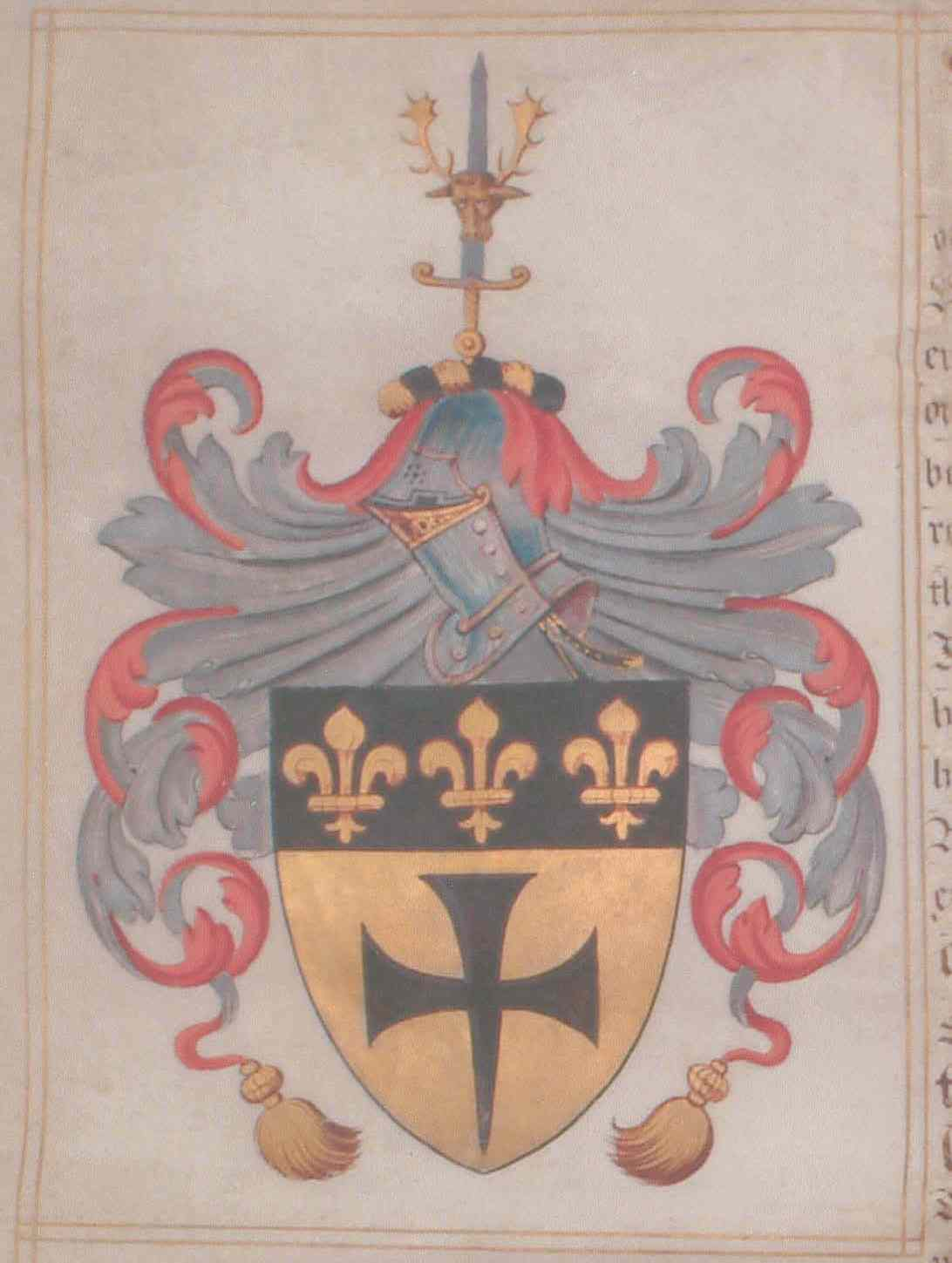
The Brockman arms. These were unchanged from the original grant, in 1606, to Sir William's father, Henry.

Beachborough Park, in Kent: the Brockman family's estate. The image dates from the time of Sir William's grandson, William Brockman, MP.

Letter from L. Fairfax, with an Account of the Victory over the Kentish Forces at Maidstone:

To the Right Honourable the Earl of Manchester, Speaker of the House of Lords, pro Tempore, at Westm'r.

My Lord,

It having pleased God to give us a Victory against those who without and against the Authority of Parliament raised an Army, I held it my Duty to give your Lordship an Account thereof (in brief), Time not permitting me at present to give the Particulars at large. The Engagement with them began the last Night, about Seven of the Clock, near Maydstone, and continued a very fierce and hot Dispute until after Twelve, before we could be Masters of the Town: The Enemy, by reason of the continued Supplies which they received from their Forces by the Passage over Alesford, were enabled to dispute every Street and Passage. The choicest of their Forces (as we understand) were appointed for this Service; and the Lord Gowring commanded them as General. There was about Two Hundred of the Enemy slain, many wounded, about Nine Hundred Prisoners, Four Hundred Horse, and Eight Pieces of Cannon, and great Store of Arms and Ammunition taken. Sir William Brockman and others of the Gentlemen are Prisoners. As God hath been pleased in Mercy to give you this Victory, so I desire that we may return all Thankfulness unto Him for it. I shall (as God shall enable me) improve this Advantage; and remain
Maidstone, a^{[clarification?]} June, 1648.

Your Lordship's

Humble Servant,

T. Fairefax.^{[spelling?]}

== Later life ==
Records show that William was still a prisoner in 1651, when he, his brother Zouch and many other Royalists were declared delinquents and had heavy fines levied against them: Sir William was fined £500 and Zouch £350. It is not known when William was released on this second occasion.

However, perhaps more importantly, Sir William was able to avoid the sequestration of his estate during his two periods of imprisonment and was able to pass this on intact after his death in 1654.

Sir William's burial took place on 6 December 1654 and the estate was inherited by his heir, James.

Sir William came from a family already long-established in Kent, which possessed a number of properties in Kent at that time. Around 1500, William's great grandfather Henry Brockman bought Cheriton Manor, Newington Manor and Beachborough Manor. Henry Brockman's grandson was also called Henry, and was the father of Sir William. He is commemorated by a tablet in St Nicholas Church, Newington.

As one of very few notable and documented Kentish Englishmen from his era, Sir William is of some interest to descendants of his relatives that now live in the US and Australia today. For example, it appears that in the aftermath of the civil war his second cousin, Henry Brockman, fled the country to Aruba and eventually to the American colonies, thus founding the English branch of the Brockman family in the United States. Later, descendants through the maternal Drake-Brockman line emigrated to Australia, several of whom were notable for their military and civic leadership.

== Notes ==
Preceded by (See English Brockman Family)	Sir William Brockman of Kent; 1595–1654	Succeeded by The Squires of Beachborough
