= Senator Brockman =

Senator Brockman may refer to:

- Peter M. Brockman (fl. 1980s–1990s), Oregon State Senate
- Thomas Patterson Brockman (1797–1859), South Car State Senate
