= Raatz =

Raatz or von Raatz is a German surname. Notable people with the surname include:

- Annika Raatz, American mechanical engineer
- Jeff Raatz, US politician
- Julius von Raatz-Brockmann (1870–1944), German baritone singer
