= Henry Brockman =

Henry Brockman may refer to:

- Henry Brockman (Australian politician) (1845–1916)
- Henry Brockman (colonist) (1647–1690), early settler of North America
