= John Brockman =

John Brockman may refer to:

- John Brockman (soldier) (1734–1801), colonel from North Carolina in the American Revolutionary War
- John Brockman (literary agent) (born 1941), American author and literary agent

== See also ==
- Jon Brockman (born 1987), American basketball player
