= Edmund Drake-Brockman =

Australian general and politician

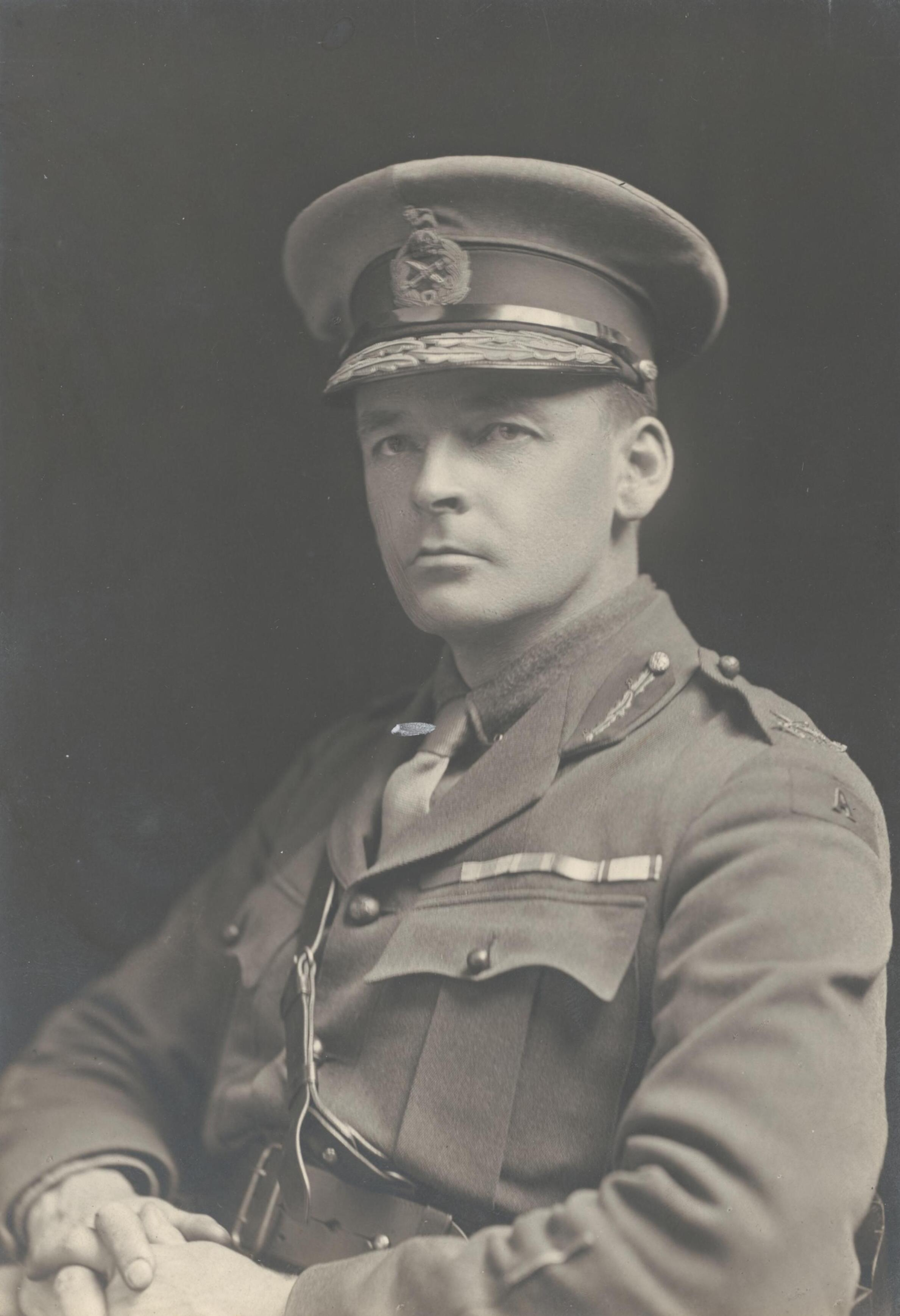

Chief Judge of the Commonwealth Court of Conciliation and Arbitration
- In office 17 June 1947 – 1 June 1949
- Preceded by: Harold Piper
- Succeeded by: William Kelly

Senator for Western Australia
- In office 1 July 1920 – 30 June 1926

Personal details
- Born: 21 February 1884 Busselton, Western Australia
- Died: 1 June 1949 (aged 65) Tarnook, Victoria
- Party: Nationalist Party of Australia
- Occupation: Soldier and judge

Military service
- Allegiance: Australia
- Branch/service: Australian Army
- Years of service: 1903–1942
- Rank: Major General
- Commands: 3rd Division (1937–42); 4th Brigade (1918–19, 1921–26); 12th Training Battalion (1917–18); 4th Training Battalion (1917); 16th Battalion (1916–17, 1918)
- Battles/wars: First World War; Gallipoli Campaign; Western Front; Battle of Pozières; Battle of Mouquet Farm; Battle of Bullecourt; Battle of Hébuterne; Battle of Hamel; Second World War
- Awards: Companion of the Order of the Bath; Companion of the Order of St Michael and St George; Distinguished Service Order; Colonial Auxiliary Forces Officers' Decoration; Mentioned in Despatches (6); Order of Prince Danilo I (Montenegro)

Major General Edmund Alfred Drake-Brockman, CB, CMG, DSO, VD (21 February 1884 – 1 June 1949) was an Australian soldier, politician, and judge. He served in both the First and Second World Wars. He was a senator for Western Australia from 1920 to 1926, representing the Nationalist Party, and later served as a judge of the Commonwealth Court of Conciliation and Arbitration from 1927 until his death in 1949.

== Early life ==
Drake-Brockman was born on 21 February 1884 in Busselton, Western Australia. He was one of seven children born to Grace Vernon Bussell and Frederick Slade Drake-Brockman, both members of pioneer families in the South West. His father was a surveyor and explorer, while his mother was known for her role as a teenager in the rescue of SS Georgette. His younger siblings included Geoffrey Drake-Brockman and Deborah Vernon Hackett.

Drake-Brockman was educated in Perth at Guildford Grammar School. He subsequently read law as an articled clerk with Walter Hartwell James's firm of James and Derbyshire, and was admitted to practise law in Western Australia in 1909.

== Military service ==
Drake-Brockman joined the Citizen Military Forces at the age of 19. In 1908 he was selected to undergo officer training with the British Indian Army at the Army Staff College in Quetta (present-day Pakistan). He was promoted to major in 1911.

Following the outbreak of the First World War, Drake-Brockman volunteered for overseas service with the Australian Imperial Force (AIF) and served in the Gallipoli Campaign as a major with the 11th Battalion. He was made a Companion of the Order of St Michael and St George (CMG) for his services at Gallipoli. Later in the war, he was promoted to lieutenant colonel and commanded another Western Australian infantry battalion, the 16th, serving on the Western Front. In 1918, he was promoted to brigadier general and commanded the 4th Brigade.

== Politics ==
Drake-Brockman was elected to the Senate at the 1919 federal election, one of a number of former AIF commanders elected as Nationalists. He was the first native-born Western Australian to be elected to the Senate, and only the second to be elected to federal parliament (after Sir John Forrest). Drake-Brockman became a "loyal government supporter". In 1923, when parliament reconvened after the 1922 election, he was appointed as government whip.

In parliament, Drake-Brockman spoke frequently on defence issues. He supported the government's Defence Bill 1921 which would have applied the United Kingdom's Army Act to the Australian military, and warned of Japanese aggression in the Pacific in the context of "the preservation of a White Australia". On trade policy, he "argued that the protective tariff disadvantaged the primary producing Western Australians" and opposed the government's establishment of the Tariff Board. Drake-Brockman was a member of several select committees, including that which recommended that the government commission AWA to develop an overseas radio communication service. In 1925 he represented Australia at the League of Nations Assembly in Geneva.

In 1924, Drake-Brockman was elected president of the Central Council of Australian Employers, an employers' federation, succeeding George Fairbairn. At the annual convention later in the year, he "urged the employers to strenuously resist the rising tide of socialism" and advocated a return to piece work rather than wages.

Drake-Brockman did not recontest the 1925 federal election, in order to allow the Nationalists to put forward a joint ticket with their coalition partners the Country Party. He was the most junior of the three Nationalist senators in Western Australia up for re-election. His term expired in June 1926.

== Judicial career ==
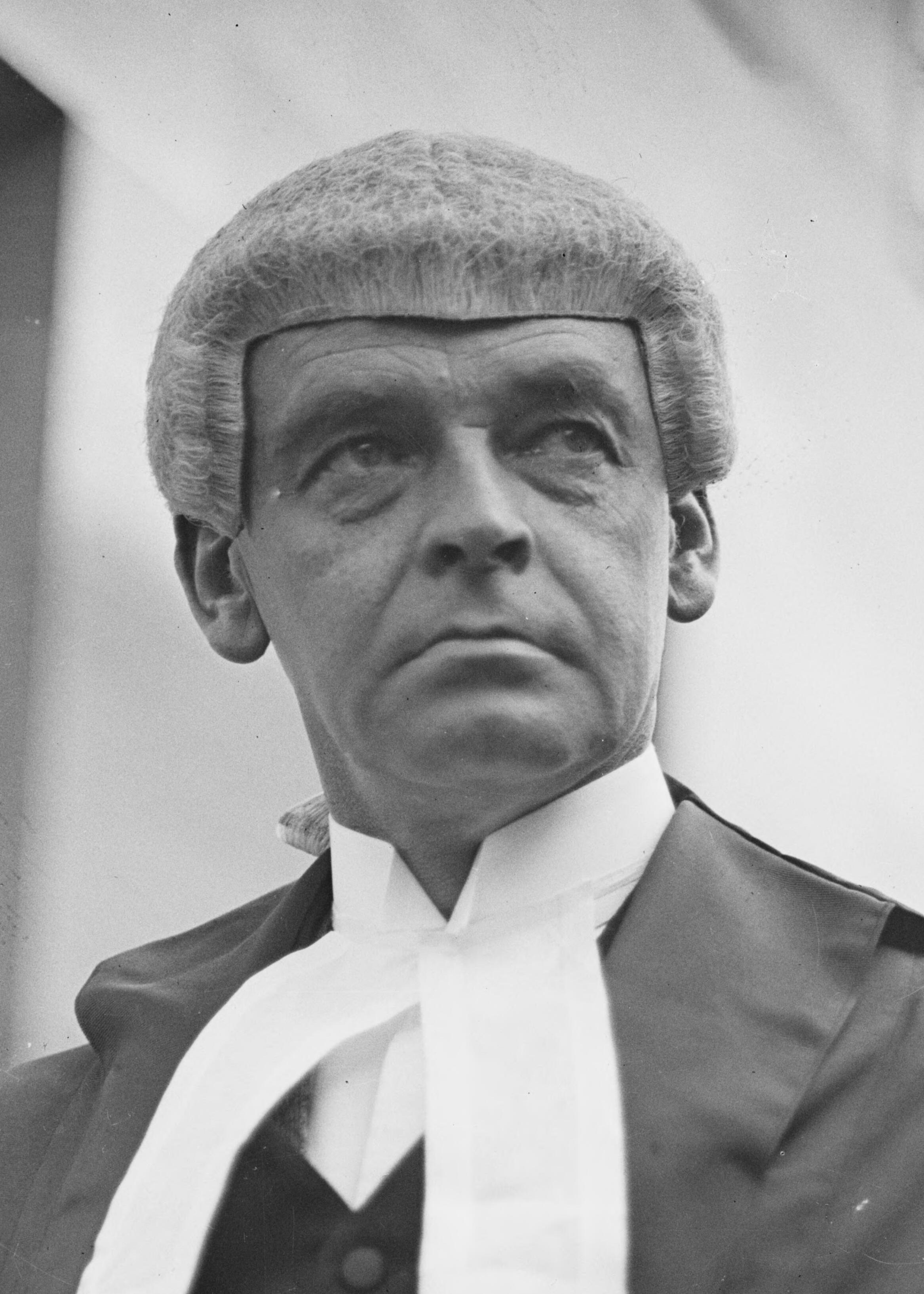
Drake-Brockman in 1927, around the time of his appointment as a judge

In April 1927, Drake-Brockman was appointed to the newly reconstituted Commonwealth Court of Conciliation and Arbitration. By the early 1940s he was regarded as the most experienced judge on the court, and in 1947 he was appointed by the Chifley government to succeed Harold Piper as chief judge, a position he held until his death in office in 1949.

Drake-Brockman delivered a number of important decisions on the court. His awards in the coal mining industry in 1939 and 1940 granted underground miners the right to a 40-hour work week and paid annual leave, as well as instituting a system of reference boards for the resolution of local industrial disputes. In 1943, Drake-Brockman raised the minimum wage for female employees in the clothing and rubber trades to 75 percent of the male basic wage, despite opposition from other judges on the court. He initially viewed this as a special wartime measure but later supported its continuation. In 1945 he presided over a series of hearings into standard hours of work and the basic wage, which resulted in an increased minimum wage and a reduction in the standard work week from 44 hours to 40 hours.

Drake-Brockman's appointment was initially criticised by trade union leaders due to his conservative politics and association with employers' groups, but over time "his judgements came to be welcomed by much of the trade union movement". His judgments were marked by a "mixture of conservatism and pragmatism" and he was known as a skilled negotiator and arbitrator with a "practical, humane approach to problems". After his death, Australian Council of Trade Unions president Albert Monk stated he had "understood the actions of the workers when others thought they were acting illogically".

Still in the Citizen Military Forces, Drake-Brockman was called up for duty during the Second World War, and commanded the 3rd Division, a militia formation, until 1942.

== Personal life ==
Drake-Brockman married Constance Andrews in 1912, with whom he had three children. The family moved permanently to Victoria in 1924, where he purchased a farming property in Baddaginnie near Benalla. He was widowed in 1946, and suffered from arteriosclerosis in his final years. He died at his home in Badaginnie on 1 June 1949, aged 65.

Military offices
Preceded by Major General Sir Thomas Blamey	General Officer Commanding 3rd Division; 1937–1942	Succeeded by Major General Stanley Savige
