= Benjamin T. Brockman =

Benjamin Thomas Brockman
- Born: December 11, 1831; South Carolina, US
- Died: June 12, 1864 (aged 32); Richmond, Virginia
- Burial place: Hollywood Cemetery; Richmond, Virginia
- Military career
- Allegiance: Confederate States of America
- Branch: Confederate States Army
- Service years: 1861-1864
- Rank: Colonel
- Commands: 13th South Carolina Infantry
- Conflicts: American Civil War

Benjamin Thomas Brockman (December 11, 1831 – ca. June 12, 1864) was a merchant and a Confederate officer in the American Civil War.

Brockman was born in South Carolina, the eldest son of Colonel and Senator Thomas Patterson Brockman and the granduncle of Tallulah Brockman Bankhead. He was also descended from John Brockman, Jr., and was the great-nephew of Major Brockman, both of whom were American Revolutionary War veterans in the English Brockman family, a cavalier family that settled in Virginia in the late 17th century.

== Organizing the Brockman Guards ==
In the summer of 1861, Brockman and his brother, Jesse Kilgor Brockman, organized an infantry company in Spartanburg, South Carolina, that became known as "The Brockman Guards". By September the 13th South Carolina Infantry was officially organized and the Brockman Guards became Company B of that regiment. Brockman was made the Captain of Company B and his brother a lieutenant. He was promoted to lieutenant colonel upon the retirement of P.L. Calhoun, and Jesse Brockman then became the Captain of Company B.

Benjamin ran a mercantile business in the Reidville area. Ladies from this area made a flag to commemorate the formation of Company B. It was blue, with gold stars and border. This flag is now housed and preserved in the Confederate Relic Room of the State of South Carolina in Columbia. The reverse side of the flag is an image of a South Carolina coastal scene by A. Grinevald, who was a painting and drawing teacher.

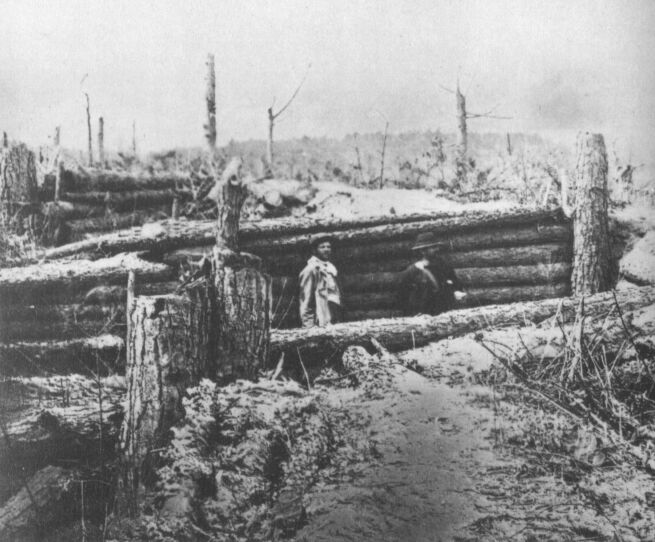
"The Bloody Angle"

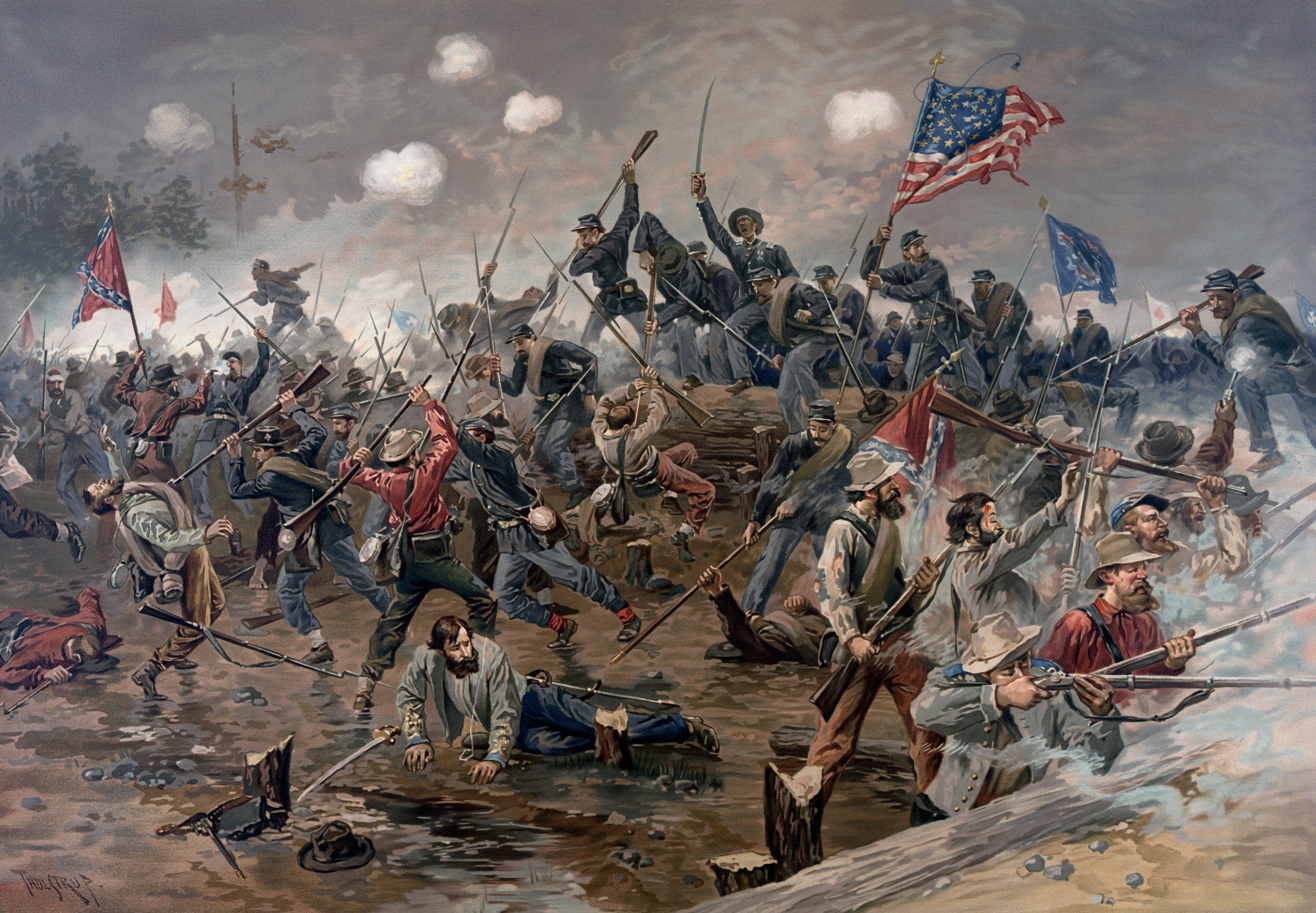
"The Battle of Spottsylvania" by Thure de Thulstrup

== Battle of the Bloody Angle ==
Brockman became Colonel of the 13th Regiment after Col. O. E. Edwards was killed. Benjamin led the 13th from 1863 at the Battle of Chancellorsville and lost an arm in a charge at the "Bloody Angle" near Spotsylvania Court House, May 12, 1864. He died one month later in a Richmond hospital from complications of this wound. Jesse was also injured in the charge and lay three days on the battlefield. He died of his wounds in the hospital on May 28, 1864.

=== Accounts of the battle ===
Here, throughout the afternoon and well into the night, Yankee and Rebel fought each other with relentlessly. Nearby, a 22-inch oak, whittled in two by the incessant musket and artillery fire, gave testimony to the tenacity of both sides.

Nothing but the piled up logs of breastworks separated the combatants. Our men would reach over the logs and fire into the faces of the enemy, would stab over with their bayonets; many were shot and stabbed through crevices and holes between logs; men mounted the works and with muskets rapidly handed them kept up a continuous fire until they were shot down, when others would take their places.—General L.A. Grant, USA

The Confederates eventually fell back to a new line, and the battle of May 12 ended, but the fight for the "Bloody Angle" would stand out in sharp contrast from other battles. Its bloodshed seemed to signal a shift in each side's perception of this war. Lee would no longer lead his men north, and instead would stay on the defensive.

After he was wounded, he wrote his sister, Mrs. Harris, wife of Dr. Harris of Rutherford, North Carolina, the following letter:

May 24, Richmond, Virginia

Dear Sister Mary;

I have been unfortunate in losing my left arm in the Battle of the 12th of May, the bloodiest fight of the War. Jesse was wounded, I suspect dangerously, and fell into the hands of the enemy. Poor fellow û the only brother I had is now perhaps cold in death, but we have to submit to such things. He was, I am informed, acting with distinguished valor, when shot. Excuse short note. My respects to the Doctor and a kiss to Edgar.

Truly your brother

B.T. Brockman
