= Battle of Maidstone =

Part of the Second English Civil War

Coordinates: 51.270°N 0.524°E

- Part of the Second English Civil War
Date	1 June 1648
Location	Maidstone, Kent, England
Result	Parliamentarian victory

Belligerents
Royalists	Parliamentarians

Commanders and leaders
Earl of Norwich	Sir Thomas Fairfax

Strength
2,000	4,000

Casualties and losses
800+	80

The Battle of Maidstone (1 June 1648) was fought in the Second English Civil War and was a victory for the attacking Parliamentarian troops over the defending Royalist forces.

== Background ==
In May 1648, a significant part of the Royalist uprising gathered in Kent and Essex. The Kentish Royalists assembled outside Maidstone at Penenden Heath with over 10,000 men raised for the Earl of Norwich. The force then dispersed to hold various towns for the King including Gravesend, Rochester, Dover and Maidstone. Together with the rebellion in South Wales, this gathering constituted one of the main uprisings that marked the Second Civil War. The New Model Army had already been split in two and the larger part sent under Cromwell to deal with the rebellion in South Wales, leaving Sir Thomas Fairfax with a force of only 6,000 men. Fairfax marched on Maidstone with 4,000 veteran Parliamentary troops to recapture it from the defending 2,000 strong Royalist force within the town. Most of the Royalists were not soldiers, being described as 'cavaliers, citizens, seamen and watermen.'

== Battle ==
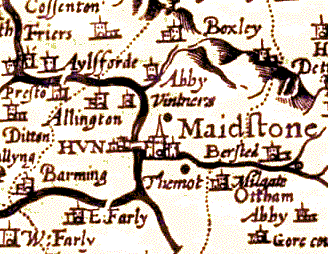
Contemporary Map of Kent showing Aylesford, Maidstone and East Farly (sic)

The battle took place on 1 June. After outflanking Norwich's main Royalist forces on Burham Heath and a diversionary feint towards Aylesford, Fairfax crossed the River Medway at East Farleigh Bridge virtually unopposed. Early skirmishes began on Penenden Heath, located strategically to launch an attack between the two defending Royalist forces led by Sir William Brockman and Sir John Mayney in Aylesford and Maidstone. The Earl of Norwich did not realise the significance of the attack until late afternoon when Fairfax decided to use his advantage to storm the town itself that same day from the south side.

The battle moved into a phase of intense fighting in heavy rain, street by street and 'inch by inch' as each Royalist barricade was ferociously defended. The battle lasted for the rest of the day with the Royalists retreating towards Gabriel's Hill, then Week Street before their last position in St Faith's Churchyard. Fairfax finally overcame fierce resistance to take command of the town just after midnight during a raging thunderstorm. Fairfax was said to be astonished when about a thousand Royalists emerged from inside St Faith's Chapel to offer their surrender.

== Aftermath ==
Royalist prisoners were initially held captive in All Saints Church. Having acquitted themselves well in a bloody defence against a professional parliamentarian attack, 1,300 Royalist men were allowed by Fairfax to return to their homes after the surrender. As a result of this Parliamentary victory, the still sizeable Royalist force of around 6,000 men remaining on Burham Heath started to disperse with the bulk retreating northwards under the Earl of Norwich with a view to regrouping and taking London itself. When they found the city gates were closed, the remnant of the Royalist force moved on into Essex with Fairfax in hot pursuit. The retreating Royalists decided to make their defence from the Earl of Norwich's home town of Colchester on 13 June where the rebellion was besieged and finally surrendered in late August after some ten weeks of deprivation and famine.

== Architecture and artefacts ==
The narrow 14th-century bridge at East Farleigh is still in use today. Several 16th- and 17th-century buildings that witnessed the battle have survived in Maidstone, such as those on Bank Street (No. 78 for example is dated 1611); All Saints Church remains recognisably as it would have been in 1648, but the small Huguenot Chapel of St Faiths has been replaced by the late 19th century Victorian church seen today.

The doublet worn by Fairfax at the battle is on display at Leeds Castle near Maidstone.

== Anniversary events ==
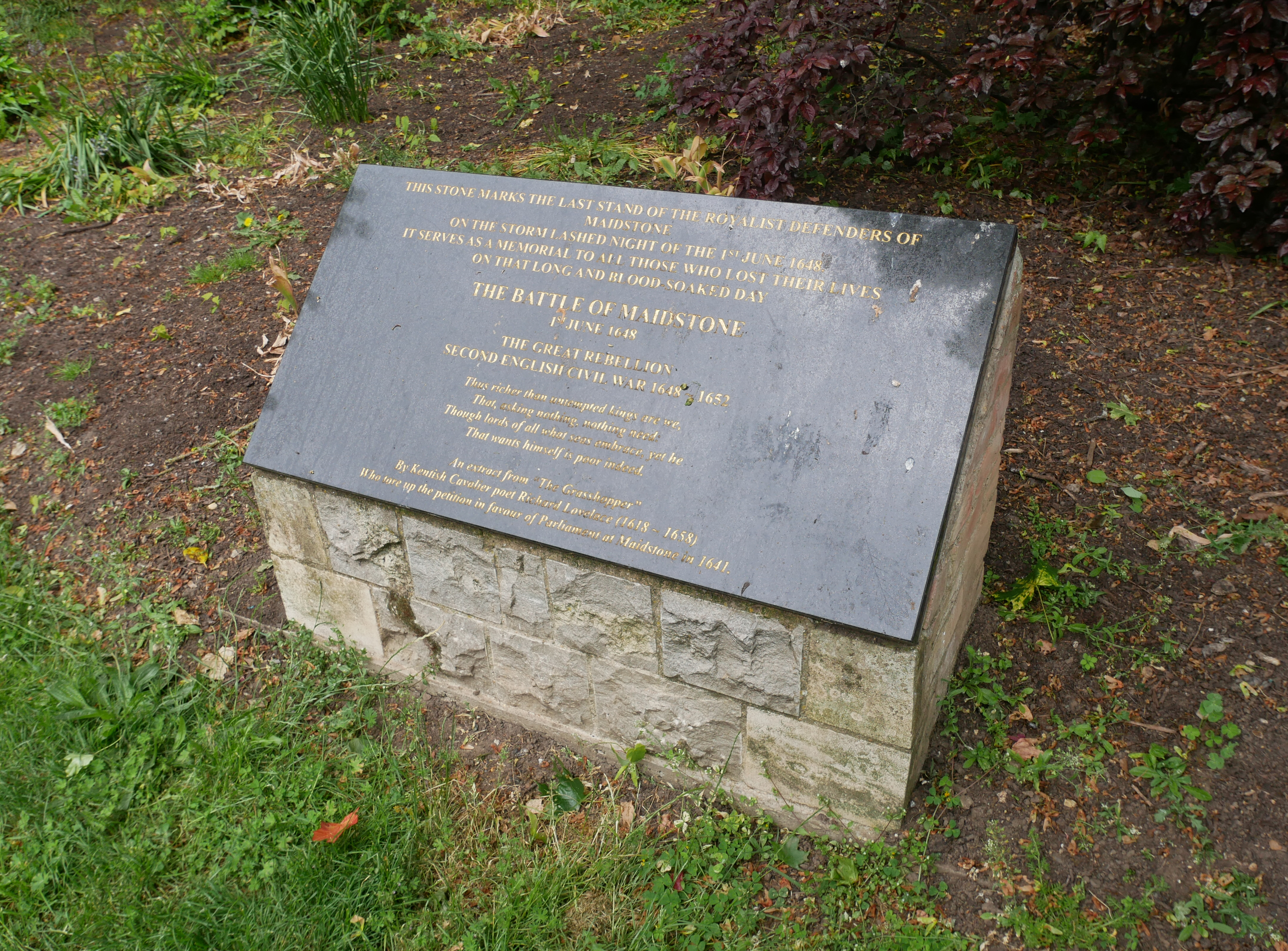
A memorial to the battle at Brenchley Gardens in Maidstone

A re-enactment of the battle by members of the Sealed Knot took place in the town centre on 1 June 2008, to commemorate the battle's 360th anniversary. Maidstone Wargames Society staged a table-top re-enactment at Maidstone Museum to mark the occasion.

To mark the 370th anniversary of the battle, a guided tour of its sites was carried out by The Battlefields Trust on 3 June 2018.

There are two commemorative plaques in the town: one in Bank Street and another on a ragstone plinth in Brenchley Gardens, unveiled on the battle's 369th anniversary in 2017.
