= Beachborough Manor =

Manor in Kent, England

Coordinates: 51.10109°N 1.09642°E

Beachborough Park was once one of the largest estates in Kent. The arms at the top belong to Sir William Brockman's grandson: William Brockman Esq.

Beachborough Manor is a manor in Beachborough, near Folkestone, in Kent. It was developed into a small landed estate, generally known as Beachborough Park, at the heart of which was Beachborough House. The current house dates from 1813 and is now owned by the Wallis family. The estate has a well-developed wildlife centre, an equestrian centre and a bed and breakfast (B&B).

Lithograph showing the Folly on the hill. It later burned down, after a firework-display

The estate passed through several generations of the English Brockman family. Like many buildings in the UK, it found use in World War II by the Allies, as an American hospital. It later became Stowe College and served in that capacity for several years. Prime Minister David Lloyd George lived there in the early 20th century.

The suburb of Beechboro, Western Australia has been named after Beachborough manor, when Henry Brockman of Gingin, the owner of part of Swan Locations, first subdivided that land into farmlets.

== Beachborough and the Brockmans ==
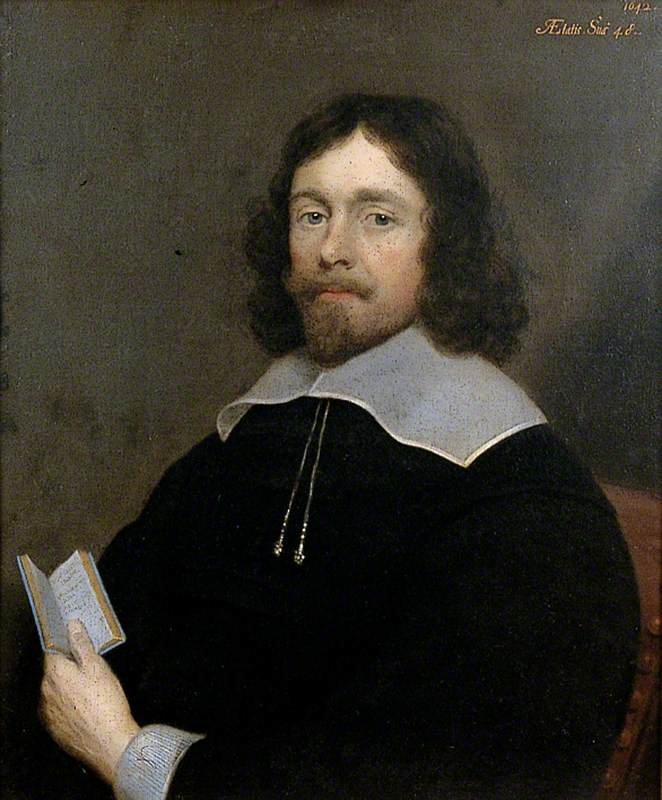
Portrait of Sir William Brockman (1642) by Cornelius Johnson

The first Brockman to become squire of Beachborough was Henry Brockman, who - around 1500 - bought the adjoining lands of Beachborough Manor, Newington Manor and Cheriton Manor, a little to the north-west of Folkestone in Kent. Cheriton has since been swallowed up, to become a part of the town, Newington is effectively the Eurotunnel terminus and only Beachborough remains, a rural idyll in a rapidly industrialising district, to give a largely-undisturbed insight into the early history of the estate.

Henry's grandson was also called Henry and was the father of Sir William Brockman and of Zouch Brockman.

Sir William Brockman (1595–1654) was an English military leader, politician, and land owner, and a notable combatant in the English civil war, wherein he fought against Sir Thomas Fairfax's Parliamentary forces. He was knighted in 1632. Brockman was imprisoned for years at a time and the estate was run by Ann, Lady Brockman.

James Brockman, was the son of William of Newington, Kent. He matriculated into Corpus Christi College on 10 December 1641, aged 15. He was born in Beachborough, Kent. He died in February, 1683.

William Brockman, MP (c.1658–1742) was the grandson of Sir William Brockman. He was a Member of Parliament for Kent, from 1690 to 1695. He was also a JP and a long-standing Deputy Lieutenant (DL), from 1689 to 1703. He married Anne Glydd, elder daughter of Richard Glydd, Esq, of Pendhill, in Surrey. They had three sons, William, James and John. William, and John - who died in 1739 - both predeceased their father, leaving James the second son as the sole heir. In 1733, William handed over the management of the estate to James and in effect, retired.

James Brockman Esq. (died 1767) was the last male heir of the Brockmans of Kent, Beachborough. He died unmarried in 1767 and bequeathed his estates to the family priest who attended to him in his last days, the great nephew of his mother, the Reverend Ralph Drake. (Vide App. VIII). Thus came the double name of Drake-Brockman, for the Rev. Ralph Drake wed the young Brockman cousin of James, took the Arms and Surname of Brockman, and saw the estates left to him. (According to the Register of Alumni Oxoniensis, by Foster, vide App. V, it states that as "R. D. Brockman, which latter name he had assumed in addition to his patronymic".) Concerning this point of the double name, see App. IX and Will of Rev. Ralph Drake-Brockman. The Drake-Brockmans produced several notable descendants in England and Australia.

Rev. Ralph Drake-Brockman died at the age of 57, on 11 November 1781. He continued the Brockman succession from Sir William via a maternal line as described above. The Rev. Ralph Drake thus took the Arms and Surname of Brockman and the estates were left to him, though soon thereafter Beachborough passed from the stewardship of Drake-Brockmans.

The Beachborough family has figured prominently in the social and public life of Kent, two of the Brockmans, Sir William Brockman and James Drake-Brockman, having served in the office of sheriff of Kent, and all those who inherited the Beachborough Estate were in the Commission of Peace for East Kent. Several Brockmans in Kent were armigerous gentry and used the "esquire" title.

== Paintings by Haytley ==
The Brockmans and the Temple Pond at Beachborough, by Haytley

The Brockmans in the Temple at Beachborough, by Haytley

Edward Haytley, a much-underrated English master, was commissioned to paint 'conversation pieces' of the Brockman family at Beachborough. These pieces show the family at leisure in their grounds, with various aspects of Beachborough featured in the background. The paintings are now housed at the National Gallery of Victoria, in Melbourne in Australia.

== Sources ==
- Burke's Landed Gentry Burke's Peerage Ltd; Jubilee edition, Mr. Bernard Burke, Mr. Gordon Pirrie (author/compiler)
- Hasted's History of Kent,: Corrected, enlarged, and continued to the present time, from the manuscript collection of the late Rev. Thomas Streatfeild and ... the public records, and other sources, ASIN: B000874L4G
- Harris's History of Kent.
- The history and antiquities of the county of Essex,: Compiled from the best and most ancient historians; Philip Morant, reprinted and sold by Meggy and Chalk (1 January 1816), ISBN 0-7158-1301-3, Another republishing, 1978.
- The Brockman Papers (records in the British Museum).
- The Brockman scrapbook;: Bell, Bledsoe, Brockman, Burrus, Dickson, James, Pedan, Putman, Sims, Tatum, Woolfolk, and related families (unknown binding) by William Everett Brockman, ASIN: B0007E8Y48 (out of print), this information provided courtesy of Paul Brockman (Virginia)
- Record of the Brockman and Drake-Brockman family (privately published) by Brigadier-General David Henry Drake-Brockman C.M.G. 1936 provided courtesy of Hugh-Drake Brockman (UK), ASIN: B00089U71U (out of print)
- Brockman & Drake-Brockman Family Tree : the Australian Branch 1830–1993. (Menora, Western Australia : Alan Jackson, 1993) ISBN 0-646-18200-5
- Orange County Virginia families: Volume III (unknown binding) by William Everett Brockman, Publisher: W.E. Brockman (1 January 1959), English, ASIN: B0007G5G0Q
