= Geoffrey Drake-Brockman (engineer) =

Western Australian civil engineer and Australian Army officer in both World Wars

- Born: 2 November 1885; Guildford, Western Australia
- Died: 27 December 1977 (aged 92); Victoria Park, Western Australia
- Spouse(s): Alice Milne (m. 1917; died 1918) Henrietta Drake-Brockman (m. 1921; died 1968)
- Relatives: Frederick Slade Drake-Brockman (father); Grace Bussell (mother); Edmund Drake-Brockman (brother); Deborah Vernon Hackett (sister); Geoffrey Drake-Brockman (grandson)
- Military career
- Allegiance: Australia
- Branch: Australian Imperial Force; Second Australian Imperial Force
- Service years: 1914–1920; 1941–1944
- Rank: Brigadier
- Commands: 9th Field Company (1917–18)
- Conflicts: First World War; Second World War
- Awards: Military Cross

Brigadier Geoffrey Drake-Brockman, MC (2 November 1885 – 27 December 1977) was a Western Australian civil engineer, and an Australian Army officer in both World Wars.

== Career ==
In 1908 he was involved in mapping the route for the railway-line from Kalgoorlie, Western Australia to Port Augusta, South Australia. In 1921 he was appointed commissioner of the Department of the North-West (of Western Australia) based in Broome; as commissioner he recommended a survey of agricultural land at the Ord River, the planting of cotton and the development of the Kimberley region. In 1946 he was appointed assistant-director of public works, and in 1949 chairman of the Western Australian Transport Board, retiring in 1952.

As a soldier, in the First World War he was awarded the Military Cross, and commanded the 9th Field Company in 1917–18. In the Second World War he was posted to Army Headquarters, Melbourne; as colonel, then brigadier, he occupied senior engineering staff posts.

In retirement, he wrote an autobiography, The Turning Wheel (1960).

== Family ==
His parents were Frederick Slade Drake-Brockman and Grace Bussell. He had four sisters and two brothers, including Major General Edmund Drake-Brockman (1884–1949) and Lady Deborah Vernon Hackett (1887–1965).

In 1917, he married Alice Annie Wardlaw Milne in Hertfordshire, England. She died in 1918.

In 1921, he married Henrietta Frances York Jull (1901–1968) in Guildford, Western Australia. She became a prolific author and also wrote several plays. They had two children, a girl and a boy. A grandson, Geoffrey was named after him.
