= Arpinge =

Hamlet in Kent, England

Coordinates: 51.106°N 1.132°E

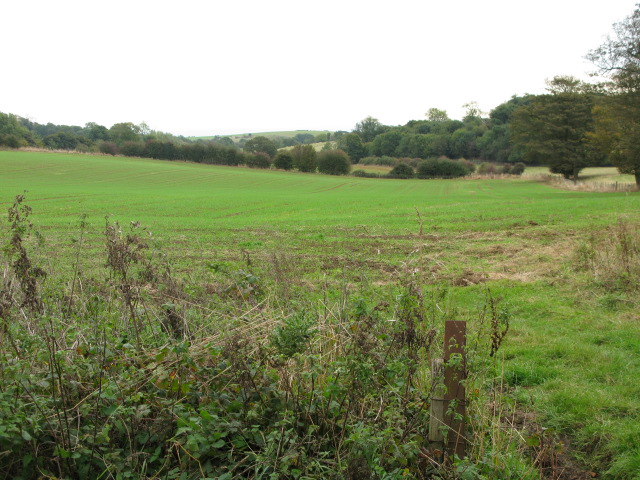

- Location within Kent
- District: Folkestone and Hythe
- Shire county: Kent
- Region: South East
- Country: England
- Sovereign state: United Kingdom
- Post town: Folkestone
- Postcode district: CT18
- Police: Kent
- Fire: Kent
- Ambulance: South East Coast
- UK Parliament: Folkestone and Hythe

Arpinge is a hamlet between Paddlesworth and Newington (where, at the 2011 Census, the population was included) to the west of Folkestone in Kent, England. It consists of three working farms, three now converted to residential use and a further four houses.

The name probably originates from the Old English 'eorpa' (dark-skinned (person)) and 'inge' (a settlement). There is no church as it falls within the ecclesiastical parish of Newington-next-Hythe. There are no shops and the nearest pub is the 'Cat and Custard Pot' in Paddlesworth.
