= Penenden Heath =

Suburb of Maidstone, Kent, England

Coordinates: 51.288°N 0.536°E

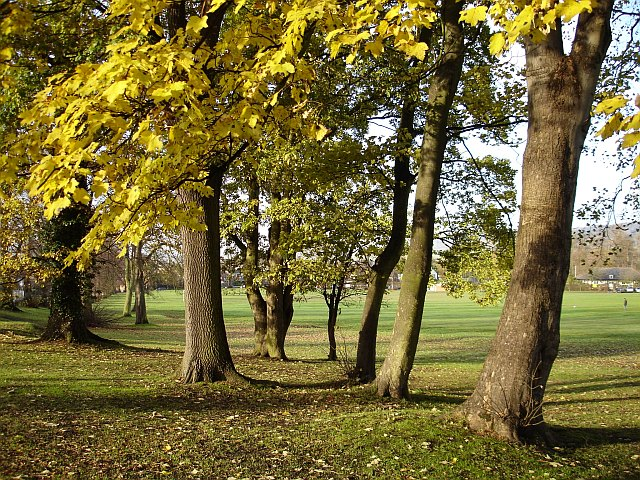
- The remnants of Penenden Heath, now a recreation ground

- Location within Kent
- OS grid reference: TQ7757
- District: Maidstone
- Shire county: Kent
- Region: South East
- Country: England
- Sovereign state: United Kingdom
- Post town: Maidstone
- Postcode district: ME14
- Dialling code: 01622
- Police: Kent
- Fire: Kent
- Ambulance: South East Coast
- UK Parliament: Maidstone and Malling

Penenden Heath is a suburb of the town of Maidstone in the English county of Kent. As the name suggests, it was developed on an area of heathland, an area of which remains as a recreation ground with some woodland.

== History ==
=== Gatherings ===
Before the expansion of Maidstone, the heath was used as a venue for shire moots during the early Middle Ages. The most famous of these occurred shortly after the Norman Conquest of 1066 and involved the Trial of Penenden Heath, a dispute between Odo bishop of Bayeux, half-brother of William the Conqueror, and Lanfranc the Archbishop of Canterbury. The Domesday Book of 1086 subsequently recorded Pinnedenna as the place for the landowners of Kent to gather to receive notice in matters of administration at the shire court.

The heath continued to be used as a gathering ground for several hundred years. Wat Tyler led a mob gathered at Penenden Heath to Union Street in Maidstone in an early skirmish during the Peasants' Revolt of 1381. The heath continued to be used as a gathering place in the 16th century, in particular during Wyatt's rebellion in 1554; the heath was referenced in Alfred Tennyson's 1875 drama Queen Mary about the rebellion. George Goring, Earl of Norwich and leader of the Kent Royalists during the Second English Civil War gathered an army of 7,000 men on the heath in May 1648 as part of his unsuccessful defence of Maidstone against the Roundhead army of Thomas Fairfax.

In 1828 the heath was again recorded as the site of a large gathering to debate the issue of "Protestant Ascendancy" before the passing of the Roman Catholic Relief Act 1829. A detailed report of the assembly on 24 October 1828 by Richard Lalor Sheil describes the heath as a "gently sloping amphitheatrical declivity" and still, in the 19th century, the principal venue in the area for massing the populace.

=== Executions ===
Executions took place at the site from the Anglo-Saxon period through to the 19th century, and suspected witches are believed to have been tried and hanged on the heath between the 12th and 17th centuries. In 1652 it was reported that:

Anne Ashby, alias Cobler, Anne Martyn, Mary Browne, Anne Wilson, and Mildred Wright of Cranbrook, and Mary Read, of Lenham, being legally convicted, were according to the Laws of this Nation, adjudged to be hanged, at the common place of Execution. Some there were that wished rather, they might be burnt to Ashes; alledging that it was a received opinion among many, that the body of a witch being burnt, her bloud is prevented thereby from becoming hereditary to her Progeny in the same evill.

In 1798 Edward Hasted described the heath as follows:

[T]hat noted plain Pinnenden, now usually called Pickenden heath, a place made famous in early times; the western part is in Maidstone parish, the remainder in this of Boxley. From its situation almost in the middle of the county or shire of Kent, this heath has been time out of mind used for all county meetings, and for the general business of it, the county house for this purpose, a poor low shed, is situated on the north side of it, where the sheriff continues to hold his county court monthly, and where he takes the poll for the members of the county, and for the coroners, the former of which, after a few suffrages is usually adjourned to Maidstone; on a conspicuous hill on the opposite side of the heath, though in Maidstone parish, is the gallows, for the public execution of criminals condemned at the assizes.

During the 18th and 19th centuries the heath remained a site for the execution of criminals by hanging. James Coigly, a United Irishman, was arrested en route to France carrying a letter addressed to the French Revolutionary Government calling for an invasion of England. He was hanged at the heath on 7 June 1798. The last public execution on the heath took place in 1830, when John Dyke from the nearby village of Bearsted was hanged for burning a hayrick; it later emerged that he was innocent. New gallows were subsequently built outside Maidstone Prison.

=== Recreation ===
The heath was also used for recreation. In 1795, it was the venue for a top-class cricket match between Kent and England, which England won by five wickets. It also staged a number of minor matches.

During the 19th century the heath was slowly enveloped by the growth of the town of Maidstone, becoming a residential area at the junction of the main routes to Sittingbourne and Boxley. Following landscaping, the heath was presented to the people of Maidstone by the Earl of Romney in 1882 for use as a recreation ground.

== Penenden trial ==
Odo de Bayeux was previously Earl of Kent and the primary landowner of the region after his half-brother William the Conqueror's invasion of England in 1066. In 1070, Archbishop Lanfranc succeeded to the see of Canterbury and requested an inquiry into the activities of Odo (and Lanfranc's predecessor, Stigand) who had allegedly defrauded the Church (and possibly the Crown) during his tenure as Earl of Kent.

Lanfranc demanded that the matter should be settled by the nobles of Kent and William I ordered that an assembly be formed at Penenden Heath for the purpose.

Various prominent figures in the country at the time were called including Geoffrey de Montbray bishop of Coutances (who represented the King), Lanfranc (for the Church), Odo de Bayeux (defending himself), Arnost bishop of Rochester, Æthelric II bishop of Chichester (an elderly bishop regarded as the authority on the laws of the realm), Richard de Tunibridge, Hugh de Montfort, William de Arsic, Hamo Vicecomes and many others.

Precisely when the inquiry was held is unclear although many historians have determined it to be between 1075 and 1077. The trial itself lasted three days and ended in the partial recovery of properties for the church from Odo and others.

== 20th century ==
Today a residential suburb of Maidstone, Penenden Heath is situated between arterial roadways at junction 6 of the M20 motorway and the A249 Sittingbourne Road. The area includes a variety of shops, a public house and a playground.

== Toponymy ==
The heath has been recorded under several names. First appearing in the Domesday Book as Pinnedenna, it has also been recorded as Pinnenden, Pickenden, Pinenden and Pennenden. It has been suggested that the name derives from the Saxon pinian meaning "to punish", which may date the site as a place for executions before the Norman Conquest.

== Environment ==
Areas of heathland remain. Mature lime trees, with some younger replacements, line the boundaries to the recreation ground. In addition, large oak, chestnut, hawthorn, sycamore and ash trees feature on the site. Heath Wood, which lies just beyond the suburb boundary, is a privately owned chestnut coppice. To the north, dense planting of native trees separates the Heath from the M20 motorway. Soil at the northern end of the recreation ground displays characteristics of heathland and dry acid grassland. Other areas evidence sheep's sorrel and common heath. Gorse and broom have been introduced in recent years.

== Bibliography ==
- Haygarth, Arthur (1996) [1862]. Scores & Biographies, Volume 1 (1744–1826). Kennington: Frederick Lillywhite. ISBN 978-19-00592-23-9.
- Milton, Howard (1992). Cricket Grounds of Kent. Nottingham: Association of Cricket Statisticians and Historians. ISBN 978-09-47774-17-2.
