= Peter Brockman =

Peter Brockman may refer to:

- Peter M. Brockman, member of the Oregon State Senate
- Peter Brockman, character in The Christmas Choir
- Pete Brockman, fictional character in Outnumbered
