= Beachborough =

Hamlet in Kent, England

Coordinates: 51.10°N 1.1°E

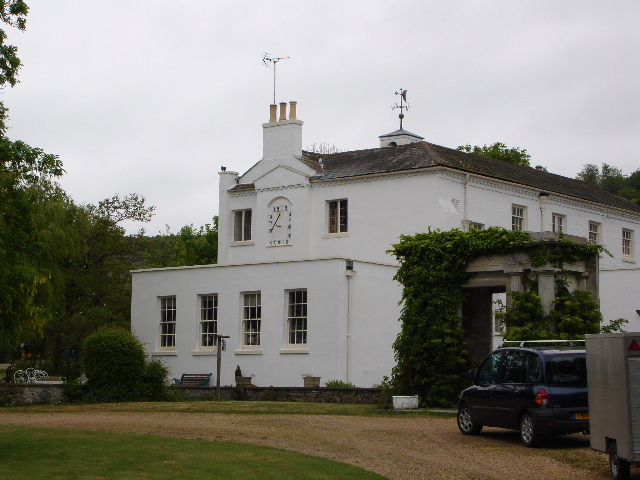
- Beachborough House

- Location within Kent
- District: Folkestone and Hythe
- Shire county: Kent
- Region: South East
- Country: England
- Sovereign state: United Kingdom
- Post town: Folkestone
- Postcode district: CT18
- Police: Kent
- Fire: Kent
- Ambulance: South East Coast
- UK Parliament: Folkestone and Hythe

Beachborough is a hamlet Northwest of Folkestone in Kent, England. It lies south of Etchinghill on a minor cross-country route. At the 2011 Census the population of the hamlet was included in the civil parish of Newington.

The hamlet forms a part of Beachborough Manor, which became a small landed estate. Brockman and Drake-Brockman families, then by other families, among whom were briefly the Markham baronets, who used Beachborough as their territorial affiliation, when awarded their title in 1911.
