= Ann Brockman (writer) =

English writer on medicine

- Born: c. 1600
- Died: 29 November 1660
- Writing career
- Subject: Medicine

Ann Brockman, born Ann Bunce and known as Ann, Lady Brockman (c. 1600 – 29 November 1660), was an English writer on medicine. She ran an estate in Kent and she compiled a "Book of Receits" listing a wide range of medicines to treat maladies from headache to plague.

== Life ==
Brockman was born in or before 1600. Her parents were Dorothy (born Grimsdiche) and Simon Bunce of Linstead. Nothing else is known until 28 May 1616 when she married Sir William Brockman of Newington Manor and went to live at his estates in Kent. Her husband also owned Cheriton and Beachborough Manor which had been bought by his grandfather.

She is known because of her writing. In 1638 she began her A book of receits. On pages she set out the recipe for making medicines to treat what we call now a thin cough, a chesty cough, ringworm, headache and backache. Her handwriting was italic and it can be seen that later additions were made because of the different inks. The medicines did not appear to be just for her family but for all the workers on her estate. The ailments can be quite small but a later addition includes a medicine for plague.

As the civil war progressed her husband took the side of the King. He was arrested in 1642 and in 1643 she wrote a petition, like many wives did, for the release of her husband. Correspondence indicates that she and William operated as a team and she had financial freedom to spend their money. Her husband was released in 1645.

In 1648 he was involved in the siege of Maidstone and he was imprisoned again and another petition was sent. During all of this letters were sent showing that she was empowered to pay taxes and deal with the estates. William died in 1654 and her son James inherited the estate, but Ann was clearly involved. She was given an allowance of 130 pounds a year. She died on 29 November 1660 and was buried in Newington.

== Private life ==
She and her husband had five children, Martha, Anne, James, Helen, and Margery, who lived to be adults. Their first child died aged four and a sepulchre was created for Henry at the local church.
