= William Brockman =

William Brockman is the name of:

- Sir William Brockman (1595–1654), military leader during the English civil war
- William Locke Brockman (1802–1872), settler and politician in Western Australia
- William H. Brockman Jr. (1904–1979), U.S. Navy officer
- William Brockman (MP) (1658–by 1742), English MP for Hythe
