= Henry Drake-Brockman =

Indian civil servant (1865–1933)

Sir Henry Vernon Drake-Brockman (8 November 1865 – 11 July 1933) was an Indian civil servant who served as a judge in the Central Provinces. He was knighted in 1913.

Born in Madras, Drake-Brockman was the oldest son of Henry Julius Drake-Brockman, Crown Solicitor of Madras, and Mary Ellinor Christian née Sims. He was educated at Charterhouse and St. Peter's College, Cambridge receiving a BA and LLB in 1886. He passed the Indian Civil Service examination in 1883 and went to India in 1886 working in the Central Provinces. He was called to the Bar at Lincoln's Inn in 1904 and became a Divisional and Sessions Judge in 1896, additional Judicial Commissioner in 1904 and a Judicial Commissioner from 1906. He retired in 1921.

According to Mohammad Hidayatullah, a future Chief Justice of India:

Sir Henry Drake-Brockman left a tradition for independence. It was said that he signed his last judgment against the Secretary of State-in-Council, and leaving the court went straight to the Railway Station to board his saloon.
