= Frederick Slade Drake-Brockman =

Explorer

Frederick Slade Drake-Brockman, also known as Frederick Slade Brockman, (9 July 1857 – 11 September 1917) was a Surveyor General and explorer of Western Australia.

== Early life ==
Born at Seabrook near Northam in Western Australia, he was the son of Edmund Ralph Brockman, gentleman-farmer, and Elizabeth Deborah née Slade.

He was educated at Bishop Mathew Hale's school and articled in 1878 to surveyor J. S. Brooking.

== Career ==
In 1886, Drake-Brockman joined the Department of Public Works and Railways, and worked as surveyor-in-charge of road and telegraph routes, before transferring to Lands and Surveys in 1891. He became chief inspecting surveyor in 1894, in which role he oversaw estate drainage and installation of rabbit-proof fencing. In 1901, Drake-Brockman and eleven companions explored previously uncharted areas in the Kimberley region. On the decentralisation of the department in 1910, Drake-Brockman was district surveyor for Nelson, before being appointed Surveyor-General in June 1915.

== Personal life ==
On 20 February 1882 he married Grace Bussell, the heroine of the SS Georgette disaster of 1876. They had three daughters and four sons, including:

- Geoffrey (1885–1977), a civil engineer, public works official and brigadier who served in both World Wars,
- Karl (1891-1969), a Rhodes Scholar, Captain in the 5th Royal Fusiliers, and judge
- Edmund (1884-1949), soldier, politician and judge
- Deborah (1887–1965), a mining company director and welfare worker, subsequently Lady Hackett and later Lady Moulden.
