= Annika Raatz =

German mechanical engineer

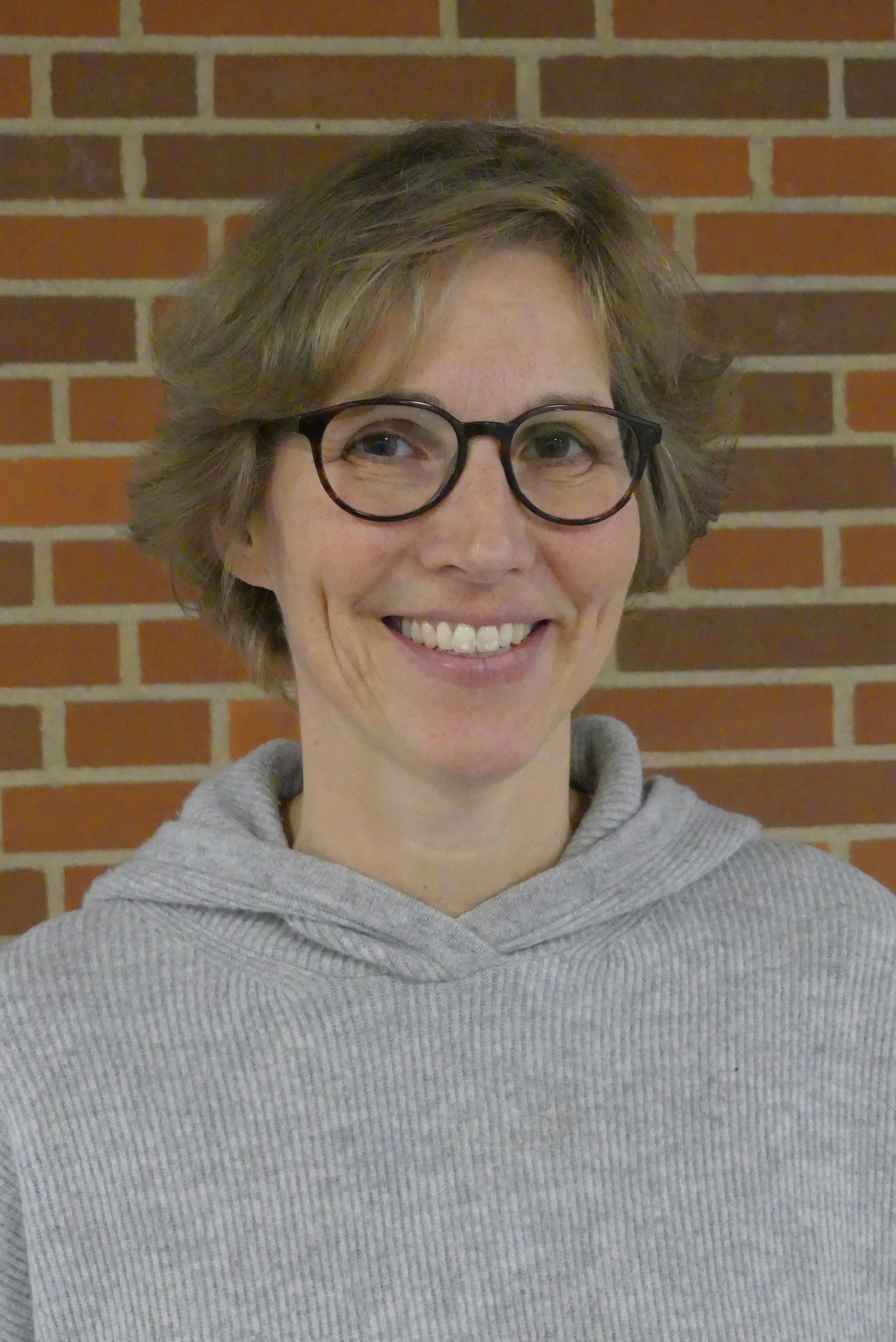
Raatz in 2025

Annika Raatz is a German mechanical engineer. She is a professor at Leibniz University Hannover, where she heads the Institute of Assembly Technology and Robotics (Match) and serves as the dean of the faculty of mechanical engineering. Her research interests include soft robotics, robotic assembly in manufacturing, and the use of mobile robots for additive manufacturing.

== Education and career ==
Raatz is originally from Lübeck. After studying mathematics for a year at Kiel University, she moved to TU Braunschweig for continued studies in mechanical engineering from 1991 to 1997. Continuing at TU Braunschweig, she received her Ph.D. there in 2006.

After continued research in the TU Braunschweig Institut für Werkzeugmaschinen und Fertigungstechnik (IWF) from 2007 to 2012, Raatz became a professor at Leibniz University Hannover in 2013.

== Recognition ==
Raatz was elected to acatech, the German Academy of Science and Engineering, in 2020.
