= Jake Brockman =

Jake Brockman may refer to:

- Jake Drake-Brockman (1955–2009), English musician and sound recordist
- Jake Brockman (Outnumbered), fictional character
