= Helen Brockman =

American fashion designer, author and professor

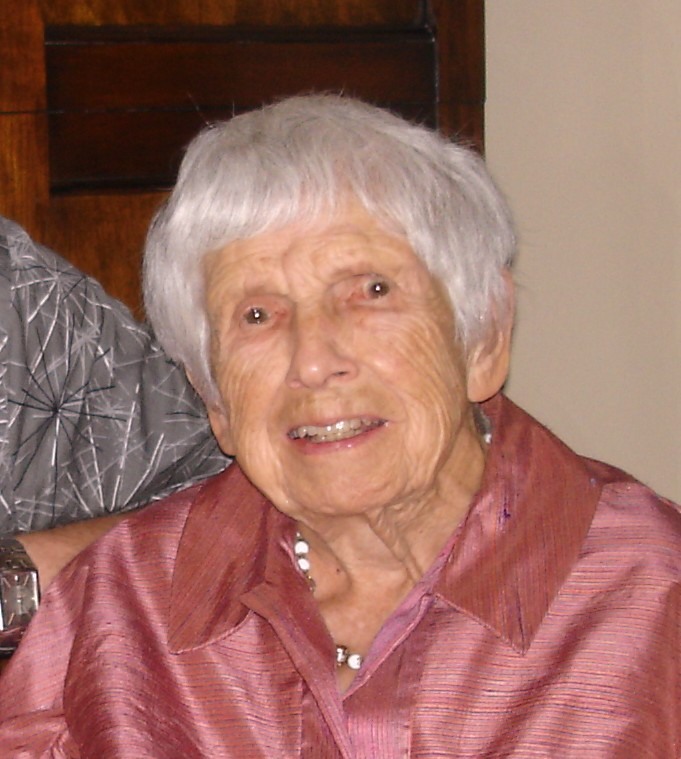
- Born: Helen Lewis; September 24, 1902; Palo, Iowa, U.S.
- Died: July 22, 2008 (aged 105); Manhattan, Kansas, U.S.
- Occupations: Fashion designer, author and professor

Helen Brockman (née Lewis; September 24, 1902 – July 22, 2008) was an American fashion designer, writer and professor.

== Biography ==
Brockman was born in Palo, Iowa to Levi Lewis and Ida Mae Ashworth. She attended the University of Iowa and graduated with a B.A. in Latin and Greek. After college, she spent seven years teaching English and history in Schenectady, New York.

She was living in New York City at the outbreak of World War II without a career, and later without a husband, who sent her a letter from London, England stating that he was divorcing her to marry his secretary, although she kept his surname after the divorce. Undaunted, she essentially created a career for herself in the fashion industry as a pattern designer. Before her first retirement in 1968, she taught at New York City's Fashion Institute of Technology for nine years.

At age 66, when most people are retiring, Brockman accepted a position at Kansas State University in the College of Human Ecology's Department of Clothing and Textiles teaching fashion design. She remained with the department until her second retirement in 1974.

Brockman's 1965 work, The Theory of Fashion Design, is what made her name widely known in the fashion industry; this text was a definitive work on the subject for many years.

Until November 2007, Brockman lived independently in her home adjacent to the university campus. She worked as a social host to visiting faculty and other dignitaries who stayed as guests of the university in the Brockman House. Helen Brockman died in Manhattan, Kansas. She donated her body to the University of Kansas School of Medicine.

== Publications ==
- Air Raid Precautions (New York: American Women's Voluntary Services), 1942 (with May Breen).
- The Theory of Fashion Design (New York: Wiley), 1965.
- Development of a Crepe Fabric for Use in Scarfs (Dayton, OH: Air Force Systems Command), 1966.
- The Skirt Handbook (Manhattan, KS: Kansas State University), 1968.
- The Slacks Handbook: Basic Pattern Development and Derivation of City Pants, Culottes and Slim Pants (Manhattan, KS: Kansas State University), 1968.
- The Slacks Handbook: Basic Pattern Development and Styling of City Pants, Jeans and Gaucho Pants (Manhattan, KS: Kansas State University), 1973.
- Mod-u-lar Pattern System Handbook (Manhattan, KS: Kansas State University Research Foundation), 1993.
- My Be-Attitudes (Manhattan, KS: Kansas State University Research Foundation), 1997.
- Both Sides of Nice (Manhattan, KS: KS Publishing, Inc.), 2005. ISBN 0-9754109-3-8
