= Reiner Brockmann =

Baltic German clergyman and ceremonial poet

Reiner Broc(k)mann (1609, Schwan-Grändzdorf, Mecklenburg – 1647 Tallinn) was a pastor, ceremonial poet and translator. He is considered to be the first poet who wrote in Estonian.

From 1634, he was a professor of Greek at Tallinn Gymnasium (nowadays Gustav Adolf Grammar School). From 1639, he was a pastor in Kadrina.

He is probably best known for his translations of hymns into the Estonian language. He also wrote ceremonial poetry in several languages. Most of his work was modeled by his colleague Paul Fleming.

He died in 1647 in Tallinn and is buried in St. Olaf's Church.

== Works ==
- 1637 wedding song "Carmen Alexandrinum Esthonicum ad leges Opitij poeticas compositum" ('Estonian Song in Alexandrine Created According to the Poetics of Martin Opitz')
- 1638 wedding song "Oda Esthonica Jambico-Trochaica" ('An Estonian Iambic-Trochaic Ode')
- 1639 wedding song "Oda Esthonica Trochaica" ('An Estonian Trochaic Ode')
