= Katya Brockmann =

Mexican rock climber

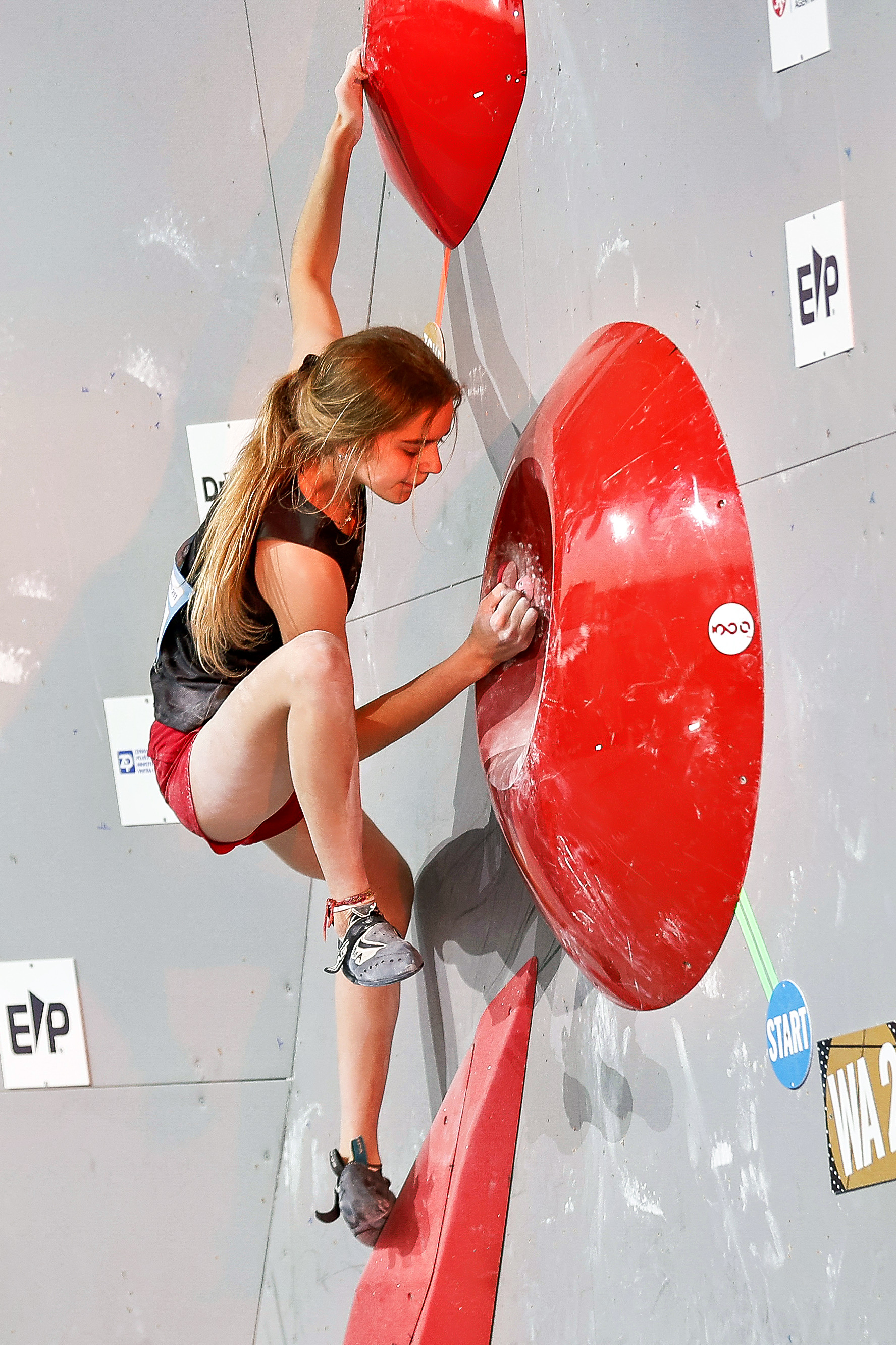
- Brockmann at the 2024 World Cup Prague

Personal information
- Born: September 7, 2006 (age 20) Chicago, IL, United States
- Education: Columbia University (2029)
- Occupation: Student
- Height: 175 cm (5 ft 9 in)

Climbing career
- Type of climber: Competition climbing; Lead climbing; Bouldering
- Highest grade: Redpoint: 5.13c (8a+); Bouldering: V10 (7C+)
Medal record
Women's competition climbing
Representing Mexico
CONADE Mexico National Olympiad
Gold medal – first place	2024 Guadalajara	Bouldering
Gold medal – first place	2022 Hermosillo	Bouldering
Mexico Youth National Team Selection Series (Mexico Cup)
Gold medal – first place	2022 Mexico City	Bouldering
Copa Mexico - Stage 1
Silver medal – second place	2024 Mexico City	Bouldering
- Updated on October 13, 2024

Katya Brockmann (born September 7, 2006) is a Mexican American amateur rock climber specializing in competition climbing where she competes as part of the Mexican National and World Cup teams. She is a 3-time Mexico Youth National Champion in Bouldering and a 6-time U.S. National Qualifier (Bouldering or Lead). Brockmann recently competed at the 2024 IFSC Pan American Sport Climbing Championships in Santiago, Chile, and the 2025 IFSC Climbing World Cup events in Prague, Czech Republic and Bern Switzerland.

== Early life ==
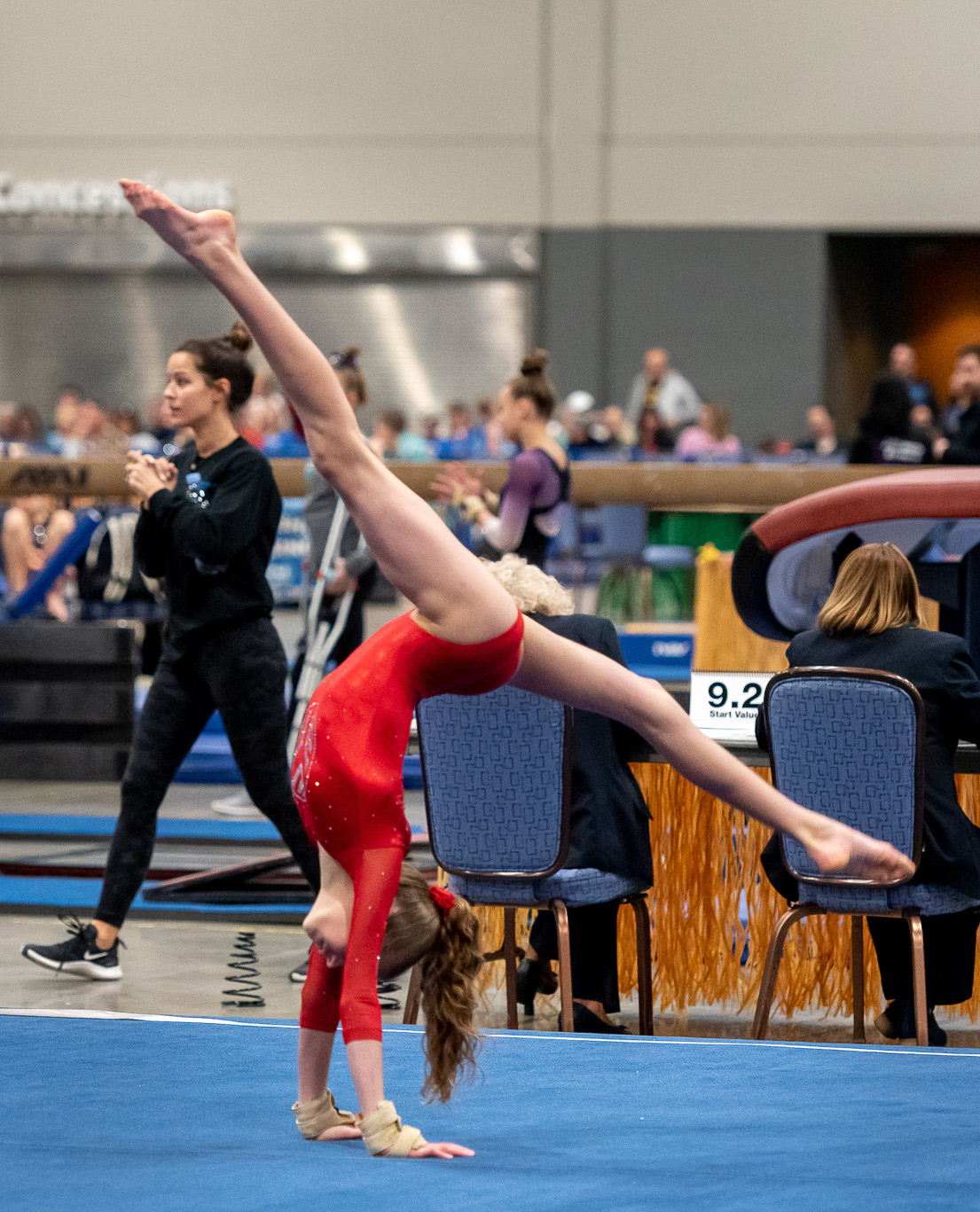
Brockmann on floor in 2020

Brockmann grew up in Chicago, Illinois and began her athletic career as a competitive artistic gymnast training from the age of 5 to 14 under head coach and former world champion gymnast Natalia Yurchenko at Lakeshore Gymnastics Academy and C.I.T.Y. Club Gymnastics Academy. At age 10, Brockmann began competitive rock climbing and was a dual sport athlete for 5 years. At age 14, she left gymnastics to focus solely on competition climbing.

== Climbing career ==
Brockmann currently competes in the USA Climbing Youth Series as a foreign national. She was a Midwest division finalist in both bouldering and lead from 2021to 2024, placing 2nd and 3rd at the 2024 and 2025 USA Climbing Division 6 Youth Boulder Divisional Championships in Indianapolis, IN, respectively. Brockmann is a 6-time USA Climbing Youth National qualifier from 2021 to 2025.

For Mexico, Brockmann is a 3-time Mexico Youth National Bouldering Champion winning the Mexico Youth National Team Selection Series (Mexico Cup) in 2022, qualifying her for the IFSC Climbing World Youth Championships in Dallas TX and winning the CONADE Mexico National Olympiad in 2022 and 2024.

Brockmann also competes in the USA Climbing Elite North American Cup Series (NACS) in the open category and was a semi-finalist at the NACS event in Gilbert, AZ in 2022.

Brockmann qualified for the 2024 Mexico World Cup Climbing Team by finishing 4th overall in the Mexico National Team Selection Series in 2023 and 2024. She made her World Cup Debut at the 2024 IFSC Climbing World Cup in Prague, Czech Republic in September 2024 finishing with the highest YTD IFSC world ranking on the Mexico team. In October 2024, Brockmann placed second in the first stage of the Copa Mexico Championship Series in Mexico City, qualifying her for the 2024 IFSC Pan American Championships in Santiago, Chile where she made her first international semi-final, placing 18th. Brockmann recently finished 4th overall in the 2025 Mexico National Team Selection Series qualifying her for the 2025 IFSC Climbing World Cup events in Prague, Czech Republic and Bern Switzerland.

In addition to competing in competitions in the open category in the United States and Mexico, Brockmann competes in the Collegiate Series with the Columbia University climbing club qualifying for the Collegiate National Championships in 2026.

== Personal life ==
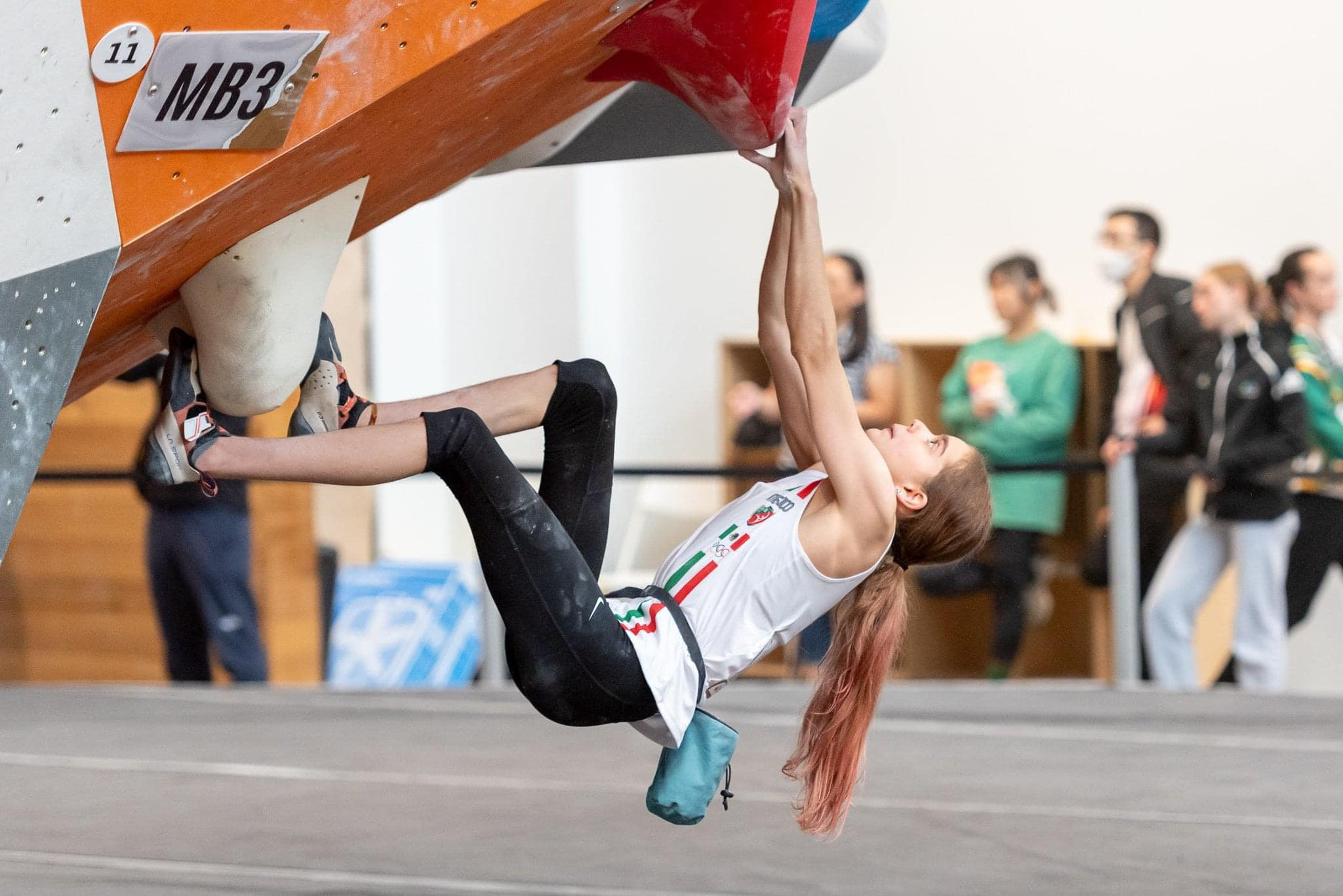
Brockmann at Youth Worlds 2022

Brockmann went to high school at the British International School of Chicago - South Loop in Chicago, IL and is currently attending Columbia University (class of 2029), studying Applied Physics and minoring in Applied Mathematics at the Fu Foundation School of Engineering and Applied Science. She also has an undergraduate research position at the Columbia Fusion Research Center investigating plasma confinement.
