= Jens-Christoph Brockmann =

German politician (born 1987)

Member of the Landtag of Lower Saxony
- Incumbent
- Assumed office 8 November 2022

Personal details
- Born: 28 March 1987 (age 39) Celle
- Party: Alternative for Germany (since 2013)

Jens-Christoph Brockmann (born 28 March 1987 in Celle) is a German politician serving as a member of the Landtag of Lower Saxony since 2022. He has served as chief whip of the Alternative for Germany since 2024.
