= Gottfried Brockmann Prize =

German art prize

The Gottfried Brockmann Prize is a juried art prize, awarded every two years since 1985 by the city of Kiel in Schleswig-Holstein, Germany.

== About ==
It is named after Gottfried Brockmann (1903–1983), an artist, professor at the Muthesius Kunsthochschule, and the former cultural officer for the city of Kiel.

The prize, endowed with 5,000 euros, serves to promote young figurative artists, who live and work in the city of Kiel or the surrounding area. The prizewinners must not have reached the age of 35 and should "show a promising development for the future". The award ceremony is accompanied by an exhibition in the Stadtgalerie Kiel (English: City Gallery Kiel).

== Previous award winners ==
- 1985: Rainer Grodnick
- 1987: Johannes Michlerv
- 1989: Carsten Höller and Thomas Karpv
- 1991: Julia Bornefeld
- 1993: Ilka Kollath
- 1995: Hansjörg Schneider and Claudia Sweekhorst
- 1997: Miron Schmückle
- 1999: Kai Zimmer
- 2001: Matthias Meyer
- 2003: Johanna Domke
- 2005: Nina Heinzel
- 2007: Katrin Pieczonka
- 2009: Hendrik Lörper
- 2011: Samuel Seger
- 2013: Benjamin Mastaglio
- 2015: Constanze Vogt
- 2017: Anne Steinhagen
- 2019: Hannah Bohnen
