= History of tariffs in Australia =

Australian governments, both those of the colonies after the introduction of responsible government in the 1850s and the national government since federation in 1901, have had the power to fix and change tariff rates. This power resides in the respective legislatures, with tariffs, being a tax law, is required to originate in the lower house of the legislature.

Tariffs have always been a contentious issue in Australian politics. At times they have been the focus of an intense debate. This was particularly true in the debate in the colonies leading up to the Australian federation and the ensuing debate in the federal Parliament when it was necessary to establish a uniform Australia-wide schedule of tariff rates. It was true also in the period of the 1970s and 1980s when reforms began the process of lowering tariff levels. The outcomes of these debates have had an effect on the growth of the Australian economy and the distribution of real household income.

== Pre-federation ==
The first tariffs in Australia were imposed on the import of alcoholic beverages by Philip Gidley King, the Governor of the Colony of New South Wales, in 1800. Tariffs were imposed on tobacco, cigars and cigarettes in NSW in 1818. New South Wales included the territory of the modern states of Victoria, Queensland and Tasmania during this period; other colonies also imposed tariffs on imported goods after they became self-governing.

These duties were revenue duties. In the 19th century, taxation of these two groups of goods yielded large revenues for the colonies. In fact, revenue from these two groups, which were known as "narcotics and stimulants", accounted for most of the tariff revenue in Australia for almost all of the century; in 1900 they still accounted for 48% of total tariff revenues from the colonies.

In all colonies, the range of goods subject to tariff duties steadily expanded during the century. The passage of the Australian Constitutions Act 1850 by the Imperial Parliament introduced responsible government in the colonies, allowing each colony to determine its own tariff policies. Increasingly, some of the new tariffs were introduced from a protective motive. In 1866, Victoria added a wide range of goods to the list of dutiable items, most of them manufactured items, all subject to an ad valorem rate of duty of 10%. Economic historians generally agree that these tariffs were intended to provide employment for miners who had become surplus after the end of the Victorian gold rush. However, a recent study found no statistically significant evidence that Victoria's embrace of protectionism in the 1860s had any effect on its manufacturing sector. All colonies, except New South Wales, followed Victoria in adopting tariffs for protective purposes rather than to raise revenue.

As the range of goods subject to import taxation broadened, the average levels of duty, in ad valorem terms, showed increasing divergence among the colonies. New South Wales continued an explicit policy of limiting import duties to a small range of goods for revenue purposes (with the notable exception of sugar which was heavily protected). In the debates about forming a federation, New South Wales was known as the "free trade" colony and Victoria, the second of the "large" colonies, as "protectionist". By the end of the century, Queensland and Western Australia had average rates which were more than double that of Victoria but revenue motives predominated in these colonies.

In the colonial era goods imported into one colony from another colony were also subject to duty at rates fixed by the importing colony. In general, goods imported from other colonies, mainly agricultural products, coal and machinery, were subject to lower rates than goods imported from other countries. However, they were still significant. The average ad valorem rates on imports from other colonies in 1900 ranged from 3.7% for imports into New South Wales to 19.3% for inter-colonial imports into Tasmania. Inter-colonial imports were a deterrent to inter-colony trade and, more importantly in the debate before federation, a major irritant in inter-colony relations.

From the point of view of the form and structure of tariffs, the colonial systems had developed features which carried over to the first Australian customs tariff. This applied to the mix of specific and ad valorem rates, the more favorable tax treatment of intermediate inputs, the complex differentiation of tariff rates within product groups or industries, and to differential rates on imports of excisable items and the excise tax rates on similar domestic products, which gave a protective margin to imports of alcoholic beverages and tobacco.

Whereas a tariff-growth correlation has been documented across countries for the late nineteenth-century "first era of globalisation," the tariff-autonomous Australian colonies did not exhibit any positive tariff-growth correlation in the decades prior to federation, irrespective of whether the economy-wide or manufacturing tariffs are considered.

== After federation ==
=== Establishing uniform tariffs ===
In framing the Australian Constitution two requirements relating to imposition of tariffs were set out. Firstly, all tariffs are required to be uniform throughout Australia and secondly that there not be tariffs on interstate trade and commerce (i.e., that all inter-state trade to be "absolutely free").

To break the deadlock in the pre-federation debate as to the level of tariffs on imports from other countries, it was resolved that these would be determined by the federal government within two years of federation. In the first and second Commonwealth parliaments, from 1901 to 1906, there were three political parties — the Free Trade Party, the Protectionist Party and the Labour Party — with the level of tariffs being a major issue between them. New South Wales had been in favour of a free trade approach while Victoria was protectionist. Parliament passed the Customs Tariff Act 1902, which was a compromise position. Estimates suggest that the 1902 rates increased the average rate of customs duties from other countries from 13.1% in the colonies to 17.5% under the new Commonwealth rates.

Federation entailed both the adoption of a Commonwealth-wide common external tariff schedule, with respect to overseas imports, and also the elimination of tariffs on interstate trade. The former, insofar as the first Commonwealth tariff was more protectionist than most of the pre-federation tariffs, was welfare-reducing, while the latter was welfare-enhancing. One study by Varian and Grayson found that the welfare gains from internal trade liberalisation dominated the welfare losses from the protectionist first Commonwealth tariff, such that net static welfare gain from federation was, conservatively, 0.17% of GDP. The shift in tariff policy resulting from federation altered the sectoral structure of the colonies. For example, employment in Queensland's manufacturing sector contracted in the wake of federation and the inflow of duty-free manufactures from New South Wales and Victoria.

The Protectionist Party, which was the largest party in the federal parliament and formed the government with Labour support, was still dissatisfied with the level of tariffs, and established a Royal Commission on Customs and Excise Tariffs in 1904. The commission reported in 1907 and recommended a further increase in customs rates. The average rate of duty in 1907 was 26.2%. Deakin's Protectionist Party introduced into Parliament in December 1907 an explanatory memorandum setting out its New Protection policy. This was a declaration of intention to raise the levels of protection from imports in Australia and also, importantly, to ensure that this protection was passed on to workers in the import-competing manufacturing industries. The party combined with the Labour Party, now firmly committed to higher tariffs, to pass the Customs Tariff Act 1908, which was called the Lyne Tariff, following the practice of naming a new act after the Minister who introduced it to Parliament. This act, more than the Customs Tariff Act 1902, propelled Australia into high levels of protection for manufactured goods. It increased tariff rates on many items, particularly on woollen goods, iron and steel products together with agricultural machinery. The 1908 act represented a triumph in Parliament of the protectionists over the free traders. The average rate of duty increased in 1908 to 30.6%.

The Free Trade Party was dissolved in 1909, and in 1910 the two non-Labour parties, Deakin's Protectionist group and the remnants of the Free Trade Party, combined to form the Liberal Party. In the same year the first majority Labour Government was formed, and both parliamentary parties proclaimed their support for protectionism and higher tariffs.

=== From steadily rising tariffs to reform ===
Tariff rates on some items were increased during World War I and piecemeal in the Tariff Acts every few years after the war. The tariff of 1922, known as the Greene Tariff, increased many rates, particularly on industries that had grown during the war. The tariffs of 1926 and 1928, known as the Pratten Tariffs, further increased many rates.

During the Great Depression, the Scullin Labor government raised many rates. The period leading up to and including the Great Depression was a particularly important period in the history of tariffs in Australia. It established high barriers for imports of manufactures overall. For instance, in 1931/1932, the average duty on all imports was 37% and on dutiable imports only it was 72%. Since then there has been an unwinding of the very high rates of the Great Depression era.

Tariffs stayed at very high levels, with the average rate on dutiable imports only remaining over 40% until after World War II. Changes in tariff rates and the method of valuation for duty purposes in 1947 reduced the average level of tariffs to 30%.

In the 1970s piecemeal reform began to lower tariff rates in some industries. In 1973 all tariffs (except those on excisable items) were lowered by 25% by the Whitlam Labor government. This was the first across-the-board tariff cut ever in Australia, although the policy motive was to reduce the rate of inflation, not to improve the efficiency of production. However, the cuts to major industries were undone within two years as the government restored their rates to the pre-1973 levels. An immediate impact of the 1973 tariff cuts was the rapid decline of local semiconductor and consumer electronics manufacturing, which was already under severe competitive pressure from Japanese and other foreign manufacturers and was facing investment decisions associated with the introduction of colour television to Australia.

A new strategy of gradual phased reductions in tariff rates was introduced by the Hawke Labor government in the 1988 Economic Statement to the House of Representatives. Initially the tariff cuts were to be phased in over a four-year period but a "second phase" announced in 1991 extended these annual cuts until 2000. This plan effected a much greater reduction in tariff rates than all previous piecemeal reforms. Phased reductions have the advantage that they apply to a very large number of tariff items and they occur annually, thus maintaining the momentum of reform and the predictability of tariff rates. They were supplemented by major reductions in the tariffs protecting passenger motor vehicles and the textiles, clothing and footwear (TCF) industries, the two industries retaining the highest levels of protection, which had been excluded from the phased reductions because they were subject to special industry plans. Post 2000 the main reductions were again in the motor vehicle and TCF industries.

The tariff rate on new completely-built-up passenger motor vehicles indicates tariff reforms of the last thirty years. This tariff item has been the single most important item in the Australian Customs Tariff since General Motors Holden began assembly of motor vehicles in 1948. In the late 1980s the MFN tariff rate on this item had been 45% and by 2000 it had been reduced to 15%. Then it was reduced to 10% in 2005 and to 5% in 2010. This is the current rate (apart from the tax on luxury cars). As the level of protection was reduced the number of companies assembling vehicles steadily declined. At the peak of the industry there were more than 10 companies assembling motor vehicles in Australia. From 2016 there were only three – Ford, Toyota and Holden. All three ceased production by the end of 2017. From the outset this industry had never been competitive at world prices and its existence depended upon high levels of protection. The impact of decreased protection of car manufacturing was magnified by historically high Australian Dollar to US Dollar exchange rates, during the years from 2010 to 2014. Australia now imports virtually all its vehicles, many from countries that protect their local vehicle markets – like Thailand – with import duties of up to 80% on imported motor vehicles. Severe overcapacity in the global vehicle market – probably exacerbated by high levels of protection and government subsidies in exporting countries – has led to vigorous price competition in Australia's imported vehicle market, benefitting Australian consumers.

=== Role of statutory authorities ===
A unique and important feature of tariff history in Australia is the role played by independent statutory authorities which were set up to advise the governments of the day on tariff policy, and later more broadly on all measures of industry assistance. The first of these was the Tariff Board which was set up in 1921. It was succeeded by the Industries Assistance Commission (IAC), which began operation in 1974. The IAC was replaced by the Industries Commission (IC) in 1990. It in turn was replaced by the Productivity Commission (PC) in 1996. This step greatly extended the range of policy matters that could be referred to the Commission so that it now covered a broad range of micro-economic policies and social issues.

Since 1921 all changes to substantive tariff rate on individual items or product groups have been subject to review and recommendation by an independent advisory commission or panel. This review has been conducted as a public enquiry. Because of the high frequency of tariff changes in Australia, this has meant that the statutory authorities have conducted multiple enquiries into some product groups. In the case of the motor vehicle industry, as an example, there have been 24 reports into the industry since 1948, though in the earlier days of the Tariff Board some of these reports related to components such as engines or bodies. This amounts to one report every three years on average into the industry. For the Textile, Clothing Footwear group of products, the number of reports is much greater.

Two sets of changes in tariff rates are exempt from this advisory process. The first is multilateral tariff changes (and other policies relating to our commitments as a member of the GATT and later the WTO) and the second is bilateral or regional trade agreements. The exclusion of these two areas has been a major limitation on advice from the independent commissions on tariff policies.

These commissions have affected Australian tariff history in several ways. They have given advice which has affected the parliamentary decisions on individual tariff groups under reference. Their advice has not always been accepted. Yet, the views concerning overall protection policy of the Tariff Board and its successors gradually laid the ground for acceptance among the politicians of the need for tariff reform.

Post-World War II they developed criteria of what production is efficient to guide their recommendations. In the pre-World War II days, the Board confined its advice solely to the specific issues of the goods under reference, following principles laid down by the Board in 1933. It was criticized by the Brigden Committee Report for its lack of an overall view of tariff policy, including its failure to develop a maximum rate of protection. From the 1960s onwards the Tariff Board became increasingly critical of the high and widely varying levels of protection of manufacturing industries. In May 1971 the Board began a Tariff Review which was to examine levels of protection in manufacturing industries. It proposed to confine rates to within a range with an upper and lower point of reference, the points being defined in terms of effective rates of protection rather than nominal rates. This precipitated an intense tussle between the reformist views of the Tariff Board, led by Alf Rattigan, on the one hand and the Whitlam (Labor) and Fraser (Liberal/Country Party) governments on the other.

The Tariff Board and its successor authorities played a major role in developing measures of the level of protection for individual industries and in analyzing the effects of the differentiated structure of protection. The Tariff Board began calculating effective rates of industries in the manufacturing sector in its Annual Report for 1968/1969, soon after the concept was invented. Alf Rattigan, the first chairman of the Industries Assistance Commission, also enthusiastically supported the development of computable general equilibrium modelling (CGE) in Australia to analyze the effects of tariffs. CGE has been applied to the analysis of proposals for regional trading agreements and for multilateral reductions in tariff levels. The results of these studies have supported those who have advocated trade policy reforms as they invariably show gains from trade liberalization, though the gains are often small relative to existing GDP.

== Impact of tariffs ==
=== Households ===
The effects of tariffs on the real incomes of households in the economy are complex and vary from one tariff decision to another but some general effects are observable.

Since most intermediate inputs have entered duty-free throughout the Commonwealth period, the direct price effects of tariffs are borne mostly by consumers of the products. A report by the Industries Assistance Commission in 1980 showed that, at that time, the consumer tax effect of tariffs is regressive, falling more heavily on lower income groups.

The indirect general equilibrium effects on the distribution of the incomes of factors are unclear and depend on the models used. The Brigden Committee in 1929 predicted that tariffs would induce an overall income redistribution in favor of labor but the later CGE studies do not find this to be true. In the ORANI model, Dixon et al. in 1977, showed that increased assistance to industries threatened by import competition would benefit skilled blue collar workers more than semi-skilled and unskilled blue collar workers. Theoretical models with capital specific to an industry show that it gains from assistance to its industry. This is likely to be the case too in Australia for those workers whose skills are specific to an industry or product group, though this specificity has not been modeled.

=== Different economic sectors ===
The pattern of tariffs and industry protection in Australia has favored manufacturers over the other two sectors producing tradeable goods: agriculture and mining. This pattern was established in the last quarter of the 19th century and it has persisted since then. The Brigden Committee Report regarded tariffs as a tax on exporters whose prices are fixed on world markets. "We may say, therefore, that the cost of tariff protection, falling ultimately on the export primary industries, falls chiefly on the owners of land, as such."

From around the time of the Brigden Committee Report, the farm lobby has sought to offset the bias by increasing assistance to farmers, a policy that was known in the 1920s and 1930s as "protection all round" or, in the 1970s, as "tariff compensation". This strategy did not eliminate the bias. Lloyd and MacLaren in 2014 quantify this bias by calculating a series of the "Relative Rate of Assistance" in the agricultural sector relative to those in the manufacturing sector for the period 1903/1904 to 2010/2011. The bias holds for every year of the century and it is most strong for the major agricultural exporters – wool, beef, mutton and lamb, and wheat and oats. It fell steadily after World War II because the average level of assistance to manufacturers fell more sharply than did the average level of assistance to farmers.

== Preferential rates and short-term variations ==
Tariff rates normally apply to all imports of an item and are fixed for the future indefinitely unless subject to later legislative change. There are two exceptions to this rule; namely, preferential rates and short-term variations due to contingent protection. The former are adjustments downwards and the latter are adjustments upwards.

=== Preferential tariff rates ===
The most important group of preferences introduced in Australia are preferential rates derived from the formation of reciprocal regional trade agreements. The second group is non-reciprocal preferences granted to specified developing country trading partners.

=== Regional preferences ===
The first preferences introduced into the Australian Customs Tariff were those granted to specified imports from the United Kingdom in 1907. These were extended in the scheme of Imperial Preferences devised at the 1932 Ottawa Agreement. This was a scheme for reciprocal preferences among the UK and many countries of the then British Empire. Imperial preferences were an important feature of the Australian tariff regime in the 1930s and early post-World War II period. The margin of preference on some items were more than 50% and the average margins were 10 to 20%. They were reduced from the mid-1950s and finally eliminated in 1980, after the UK accession to the European Economic Community.

Subsequently, Australia has formed regional trading agreements which are in force with New Zealand first and now ten other countries or groups of countries and more agreements have been signed but are not yet in force and still more are under negotiation. A feature of these agreements is that Australia has reduced the preferential rate to zero for all tariff items in the agreements (when fully implemented according to the schedule); this holds notably for the agreements with USA, China, ASEAN and New Zealand. It is one of only a handful of countries in the WTO that has done so.

These preferences have contributed significantly to the lowering of average tariff rates since 1983 though this effect has been limited by some restrictive rules of origin. Moreover, the agreements have contributed to a more efficient allocation of resources in the economy. Some commentators have been concerned about the costs of trade diversion. But the margins of preference are much less than those granted to the UK in the heyday of Imperial preferences because the MFN (non-preferential) rates have been steadily reduced and we have signed with countries supplying most of our imports and most notably with China. Consequently, trade diversion is small.

=== Preferences to imports from developing countries ===
Australia was the first developed country to grant tariff preferences to designated developing countries under Part IV of the GATT. It did so in the 1966 Australian System of Tariff Preferences. Subsequently, further preferences to Developing Countries have been granted to Papua New Guinea and other Pacific countries but the scope of these preferences is much less than those under reciprocal trade agreements.

=== Contingent protection ===
Australia passed legislation allowing for the application of antidumping duties in the Australian Industries Preservation Act 1906. It was one of the first countries to do so and since then the scope of provisions permitting contingent protection have been widened from time to time. Provision was made for the application of countervailing duties in 1961 and, after the removal of comprehensive import licensing as a protective measure in Australia, provision was made for the application of temporary duties in 1960. Temporary duties have been permitted under GATT/WTO rules as a safeguard measure. Throughout the whole of period of the GATT/WTO world trade rules, Australia has been one of the most frequent users of contingent protection.

Duty collected from contingent protection duties is recorded in statistics of total duty collected and therefore enters into the calculation of average tariff rates. As a component of total duty collected these duties are quite small. However, they have been applied most of the time to industries which already have above-average levels of (nominal and effective) protection, and the implicit ad valorem rates of contingent duty are generally high. For example, in the recent period 2014/2015, 60% of dumping and countervailing measures were imposed on steel products and the average dumping duty over the period 2009 to 2015 was 17%. As a second example, the Industries Assistance Commission estimated that these temporary quotas on TCF products were equivalent to an ad valorem tax of 40%.

All three forms of contingent protection have played a part disproportionate to the importance of the duty collected. As top-up measures available virtually on demand, they have helped to maintain heavily protected producers whose existence was vulnerable to import competition.

== Trends ==
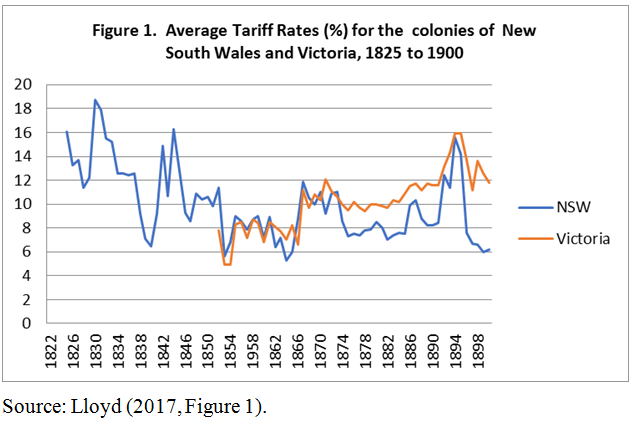
Average tariff rates for colonies of New South Wales and Victoria, 1825 to 1900 compiled by Peter John Lloyd, Professor of Economics, University of Melbourne

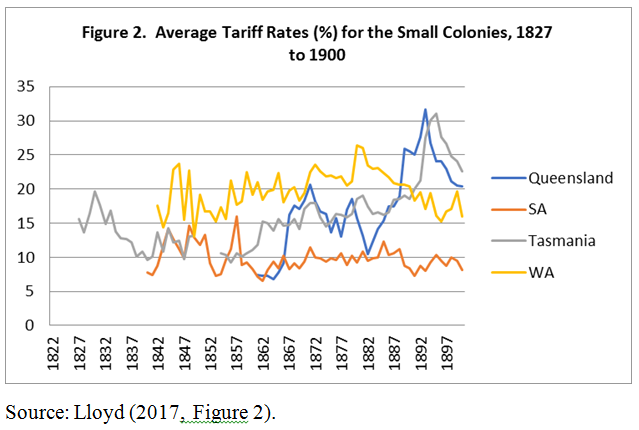
Average tariff rates for the small colonies of Australia, 1827 to 1900

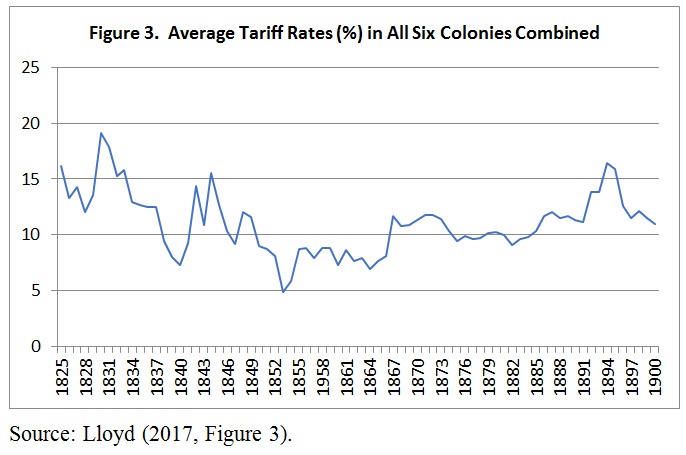
Average tariff rates in all six Australian colonies combined from 1825 to 1900

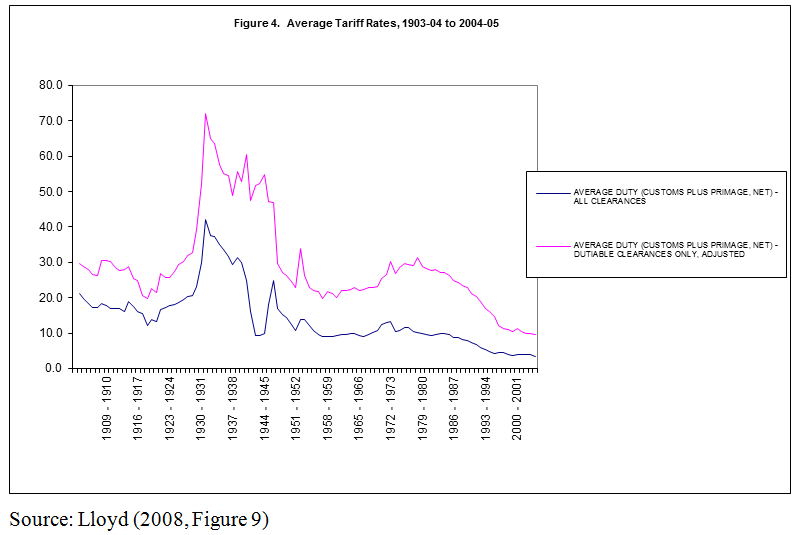
Average Australia tariff rates, 1903/1904 to 2004/2005

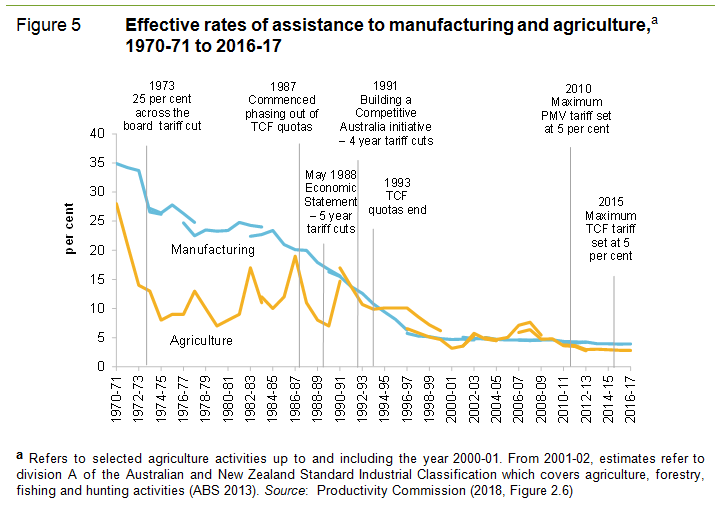

== Non-tariff assistance ==
Although tariffs have been the dominant form of industry assistance for most of the past two hundred years, non-tariff forms of assistance – such as import quotas, content plans and subsidies – have benefitted particular industries or product groups.

There have been two periods when non-tariff measures have dominated tariff assistance. The first was the period from 1939 to 1960 when comprehensive import licensing was the principal form of assistance.

The second is the period beginning in the late 1990s when monetary forms of assistance through the Commonwealth budgeting process have become more important. In its annual Trade and Assistance Review, the Productivity Commission divides industry assistance into three categories – net tariff assistance (tariff output assistance less tariff input penalty), budgetary outlays and tax concessions. It calculates these statistics for the four sectors of the economy – Primary Production, Mining, Manufacturing and Services – and for individual industries within these sectors.

The growth of assistance through the budget is a major change in the traditional pattern of assistance. Further, a new pattern of assistance is emerging within budget assistance, with a much higher proportion of budget assistance going to R& D, clean energy, export development and to small businesses. Most of this is not industry-specific and does not result from the traditional industry or product-specific arguments advanced to justify tariffs.

Manufacturing is still more reliant than the other sectors on tariff assistance – in 2016/2017, it got 72% of its Net Combined Assistance through the tariff regime and 28% from the budget. By comparison, however, budgetary assistance provided less than 5% of total net assistance to this sector in the early 1980s. The shift has been due partly to falling tariffs but mostly to rapidly rising budget assistance As a consequence, in the last two decades the Australian success in reforming its tariff regime has been halted by the growth of industry assistance through the budget.
