= Newington, Folkestone and Hythe =

Village in Kent, England

Coordinates: 51.092°N 1.114°E

Newington
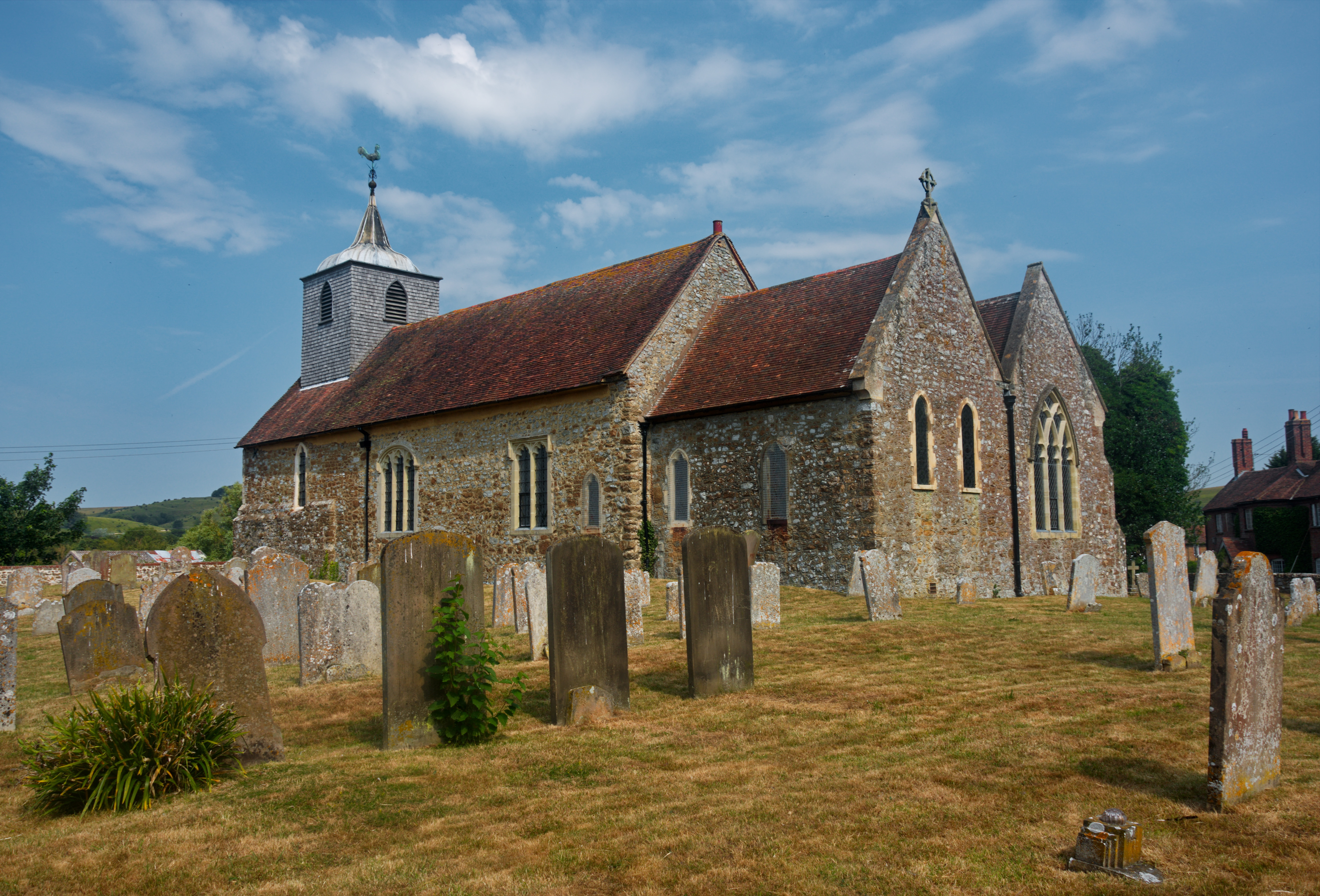
- St Nicholas' Church, Newington

- Location within Kent
- Population: 368 (parish, 2011 Census)
- District: Folkestone and Hythe
- Shire county: Kent
- Region: South East
- Country: England
- Sovereign state: United Kingdom
- Post town: FOLKESTONE
- Postcode district: CT18
- Dialling code: 01303
- Police: Kent
- Fire: Kent
- Ambulance: South East Coast
- UK Parliament: Folkestone and Hythe

Newington is a village and civil parish in the English county of Kent located 1 mile (1.6 km) north-west of Folkestone. It gives its name to Newington Parish Council, which has five councillors, and includes the hamlets of Arpinge and Beachborough. The village lies to the north of the M20 motorway and the A20 road; the Channel Tunnel complex is nearby.

The ecclesiastical parish was known as Newington-next-Hythe, the latter town being 2 1/2 miles (4.0 km) to the south-west; the parish church is dedicated to St Nicholas. Nearby there used to be a 13th-century Augustinian priory, founded in 1253 by Sir John Maunsell, who became a counsellor of King Henry III.

The parish includes the hamlet of Peene which was joined to the Elham Valley Railway. Although no station existed at Peene, the railway passed over a bridge in the village. The village is now home to the Elham Valley Railway Museum.
