= Julius von Raatz-Brockmann =

German opera singer

Julius von Raatz-Brockmann (29 April 1870 – 7 December 1944) was a German baritone concert singer and voice teacher.

Born in Hamburg, he died in Perleberg at age 74.
