= Thomas Patterson Brockman =

American politician

Colonel Thomas Patterson Brockman (December 4, 1797 – August 20, 1859) was an American merchant and planter in the Greenville District who also owned land in the Spartanburg District. He was born in the Greenville District (now Greenville County), South Carolina, the son of Susannah Patterson and Henry Brockman. According to the 1850 slave schedules, he possessed thirty slaves in Greenville. He was also a member of the South Carolina House of Representatives and the South Carolina Senate.

== Title of Colonel ==
Brockman was listed as a noted member of the community in Greenville as early as 1831, when he served as a parade marshal on the Fourth of July, as appointed by Perry E. Duncan and committee. At that ceremony he led three companies of militia, accompanied by Colonel Barron, Colonel Greene, and Major Goodlett. Brockman was colonel of the Third Regiment of the state militia (1831–1834).

== Political life ==
Brockman was a prominent Unionist in the years before the Civil War. In 1832–1833, he served as Greenville delegate to the state convention on Nullification; he voted against nullification. He was state Senator from the Greenville district from 1836 to 1839, and Commissioner of Roads and of Public Buildings in 1844,

The slavery issue came to a head with the Compromise of 1850. South Carolina secessionists asserted that if the Compromise passed, South Carolina should withdraw from the Union.

Brockman's town of Greenville had long been a Unionist stronghold. In the October state elections of 1850, Brockman was elected state Senator, and fellow Unionists Benjamin Perry and Perry E. Duncan were also elected to the legislature. The Unionist started a newspaper, the Southern Patriot, to support the cause.

Nonetheless, the legislature called for a convention to be held to decide on secession. Brockman and other Unionists worked to delay the convention as long as possible, collaborating with the "cooperationist" faction. ("Cooperationists" did not explicitly opposed secession, but said that South Carolina should not act on its own, but only in "cooperation" with other Southern states.) When the convention delegates were finally elected in 1852, the Unionists and cooperationists defeated the secessionists 25,062 to 17,617. The Union was safe (for the time being) thanks in large part to the efforts of Brockman and the other Unionists of Greenville.

The election of Lincoln in 1860 caused a new crisis. Despite Brockman's efforts, South Carolina declared secession in December 1860, commencing the American Civil War. This was a tragic outcome for Brockman, as both of his sons (Benjamin T. Brockman and Jesse Brockman) died while serving in the Confederate Army with the 13th South Carolina Infantry.

Brockman's granddaughter Tallulah James Brockman married Alabama politician John H. Bankhead, a future U.S. Representative and Senator. Their son William Brockman Bankhead was a U.S. Representative and Speaker of the House; their son John H. Bankhead II was a U.S. Senator.

== Positions held ==
=== State Senate Committees ===
- State Senator Greenville District (1836–1839), (1850–1855)
- Committee on accounts and vacant offices (1836–1838), (1854–1855)
- Internal Improvements (1836–1839)
- Privileges and Elections (1836–1839)
- Incorporations (1838–1839)
- Pensions (1850–1851)
- Roads, Bridges, and Ferries (1850–1851)
- Claims and Grievances (1852–1853)

=== Other positions ===
- Colonel Third Regiment State Militia (1831–1832)
- South Carolina Representative to South Western Railroad Bank Stockholder's Meeting (1839)
- Commissioner of Roads (1844, 1851, 1854)
- Commissioner of Public Buildings (1844, 1851, 1854)
- Presidential Elector (1852)

=== Activities against secession ===
Brockman, Benjamin Franklin Perry, and Perry Emory Duncan were all prominent Unionists.

- Represented Greenville at Nullification Convention, voted against (1832–1833)
- Authored a pamphlet advocating a Southern Convention rather than a state convention (1851)
- Southern Rights state convention (1852)

== Sources ==
- Kibler, Lillian Adele (1946). Benjamin F. Perry, South Carolina Unionist Duke University Publications.
- Taylor, C. R., Morgan, M. L., and Bailey, N. L. (1986). Biographical Dictionary of the South Carolina Senate, 1776–1985, Vol I Abbott-Hill. Columbia, South Carolina, University of South Carolina Press.
- Clark, Henry William (1905). Clark, Parks, Brockman, and Dean Families.
