= John Brockman (soldier) =

American militiaman

John Brockman, Jr. (May 8, 1735 – January 31, 1801) provided sundries and cash for North Carolina militia during the American Revolutionary War.

== Early years ==
Brockman was born on May 8, 1735, in King and Queen County, Province of Virginia, to John and Mary (Collins) Brockman, who later moved to Orange County, Virginia. His mother was the daughter of Captain Joseph Collins and Susannah Robertson. John Jr. was the grandson of Samuel Brockman and the great-grandson of Henry Brockman who was a primary founder of the English Brockman family in the United States. John Brockman, Jr., was orphaned when his father died; the court appointed a guardian, Kelly Jennings (second husband of Mary Collins), for Brockman's younger siblings, but excluded John as he was over the age of 14.

John Brockman, Jr., married Amelia Martin, the daughter of Robert and Ann (Eason) Martin. They lived at "Thornhill" in Orange County, Virginia.

== American Revolution ==
During the American Revolutionary War, Brockman has been reputed to be the colonel and leader of "John Brockman's Regiment" in the North Carolina militia. There is a record of Brockman's supplying the Patriot militia with 2500 pounds currency. The Daughters of the American Revolution have recorded Brockman as a veteran and participated in unveiling a headstone in his honor.

== Death ==
He died on January 31, 1801, in Laurens District, South Carolina. He is buried at the Clear Spring Baptist Church Cemetery, Simpsonville, Greenville County, South Carolina.

== Sources ==
- North Carolina Historical Commission: "For sundries furnished and cash paid the Militia of North Carolina, Virginia and South Carolina as allowed by the Auditor of Hillsborough District in December, 1781, as per report No. 81 Entry number 1400, John Brockman, 2500.00 currency."
- Orange County Virginia families: Volume III (Unknown Binding) by William Everett Brockman, Publisher: W.E. Brockman (January 1, 1959), English, ASIN: B0007G5G0Q
- The Brockman Family Cemetery, Pinckney District Chapter, Cherokee, Spartanburg, Union Counties, South Carolina Genealogical Society, Summer, 1993, Vol 17, No 2.
- Greenville Co South Carolina Cemetery Survey, Vol II, Greenville Chapter of South Carolina Genealogical Society.
- Clark, Parks, Brockman and Dean, Davis and Goss Families in Five Parts by Henry William Clark, Montgomery, Al, 1905, Printed by the author.
- Early American History, Volume II, William Everett Brockman, Compiler and Publisher, 1926, Poucher-Printers, Minneapolis, 1926. Family History Library, Salt Lake, UT
- The Brockman Scrapbook, 1952, William Everett Brockman, Midland National Bank, Minneapolis 1, Minnesota. - Research of Leonardo Andrea.
- Will of Henry Brockman, Recorded in Will Book B. Pages 135-136. The original will is in the SC State Archives.
- Will of John Brockman, Jr. 1801, Laurens Co, SC, Box 9, pkg 6.
- Will of John Brockman, Sr., Orange Co., VA Order Book 6, page 233.
- Will of Robert Martin, Orange Co., VA Will Book 3, page 49-50.
