= Deborah Vernon Hackett =

Australian philanthropist (1887–1965)

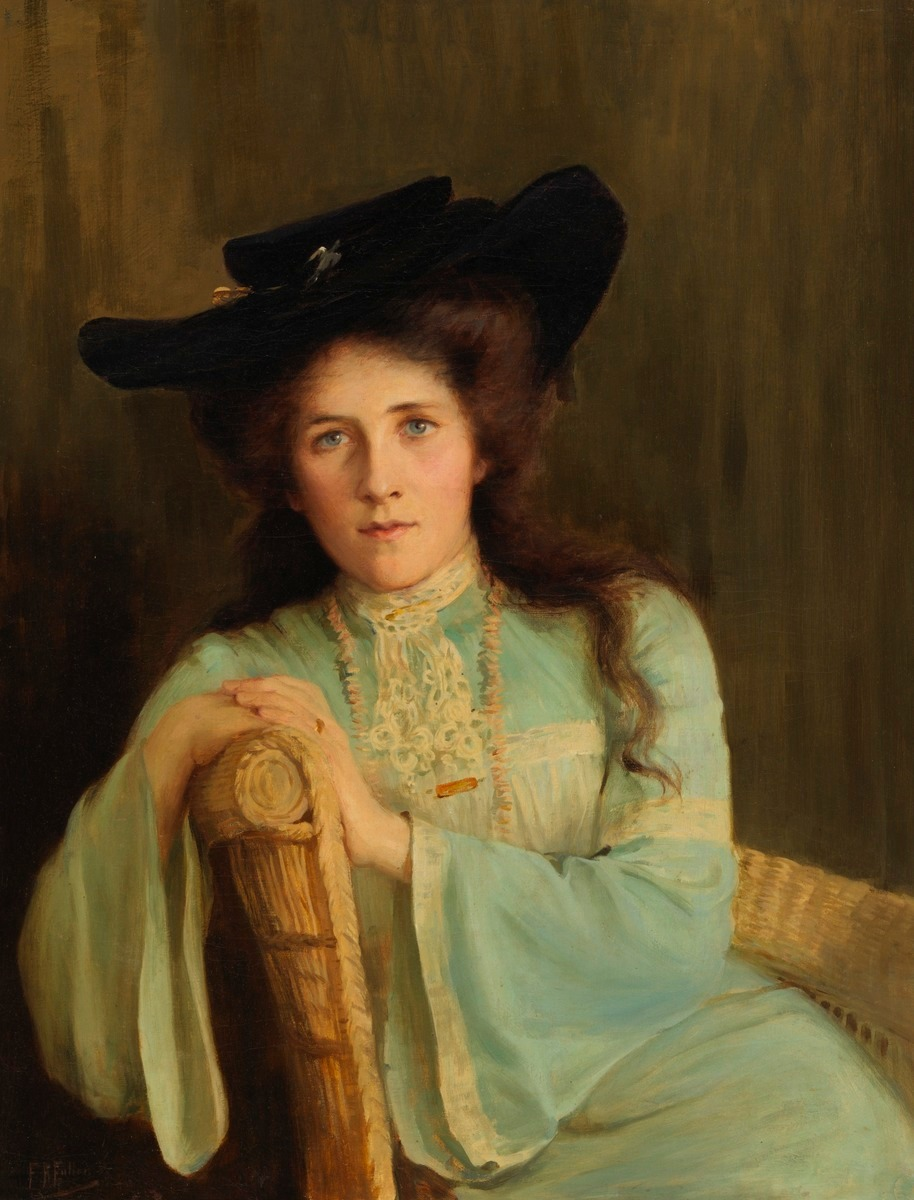
- A 1908 portrait of Lady Hackett, by Florence Fuller
- Born: Deborah Vernon Drake-Brockman; 18 June 1887; West Guildford, Western Australia
- Died: 16 April 1965 (aged 77); Kilsyth, Victoria, Australia
- Other names: Lady Hackett; Lady Moulden; Dr Buller Murphy
- Occupation: Philanthropist

Deborah Vernon Buller Murphy (née Drake-Brockman, previously Hackett and Moulden; 18 June 1887 – 16 April 1965), best known as Lady Hackett or Lady Moulden, was an Australian community worker, philanthropist, and mining investor.

== Early life ==
Born in West Guildford, Western Australia, on 18 June 1887, she was the daughter of surveyor Frederick Slade Drake-Brockman and heroine Grace Vernon Bussell and younger sister of Edmund Drake-Brockman. She was educated at Guildford Grammar School as one of the few female pupils admitted at that time.

== Marriages and family ==
On 3 August 1905, at the age of 18, she married Sir John Winthrop Hackett (1848–1916), who was forty years her senior. He was a newspaper proprietor, newspaper editor, and prominent Western Australian politician. They had a son, also named John Winthrop Hackett (later General Sir John Hackett (1910–1997) commander-in-chief of the British Army on the Rhine before becoming principal of King's College London upon retirement), and four daughters. Hackett senior died in 1916 leaving a large estate to his family, and a large endowment to the University of Western Australia.

On 10 April 1918, Lady Hackett, now aged 30, married (later Sir) Frank Beaumont Moulden and moved to Adelaide; she was Lady Mayoress of Adelaide 1919–1921, and became Lady Moulden in 1922. Moulden died after a cerebral haemorrhage on 8 April 1932. "Having no children, he helped to raise his wife's five and the three of his late brother".

On 27 June 1936, she married Basil Buller Murphy, a barrister nine years her junior; she became known as Dr Buller Murphy. He died on 10 March 1963. She died at her home, Lordello (in Kilsyth, Victoria), on 16 April 1965 and was buried in Karrakatta cemetery, Perth.

== Achievements ==
Lady Hackett helped produce The Australian Household Guide of 1916.

In 1923 she became interested in tantalite, a rare mineral found in the Northern Territory and at Wodgina in Western Australia. Tantalite was scarce throughout the world, and the price of tantalum was enormous; she saw the wealth that it could bring to Australia, particularly if it were processed in Australia, but the government was not particularly interested in the idea. She founded Tantalite Ltd which was incorporated in 1932. In World War II her tantalum was used in developing radar; the need for it became so obvious to the previously reluctant Commonwealth government that it resumed Tantalite Ltd for the duration of the war.

In 1932, the University of Western Australia conferred upon her an honorary Doctorate of Laws. The degree was awarded in absentia, being unavailable due to the recent death of Sir Frank Moulden.
