= Peter M. Brockman =

American politician

Member of the Oregon Senate from the 27th district
- In office January 12, 1985 – January 11, 1993
- Preceded by: Fred W. Heard
- Succeeded by: Neil Bryant

Personal details
- Born: August 1938 St. Louis, Missouri
- Died: June 11, 2000 (aged 61) Portland, Oregon
- Party: Republican
- Education: University of Santa Clara

Peter Marik Brockman is an American politician who served as a Republican member of the Oregon State Senate, representing Oregon's 27th Senate District from 1985 until 1993.
