= Mayney baronets =

Extinct baronetcy in the Baronetage of England

The Mayney Baronetcy, of Linton in the County of Kent, was a title in the Baronetage of England. It was created on 29 June 1641 for Sir John Mayney, who later fought for the Royalist side in the English Civil War. The title became extinct on the death of the second Baronet in 1706.

== Mayney baronets, of Linton (1641) ==
- Sir John Mayney, 1st Baronet (c. 1608 – c. 1676)
- Sir Anthony Mayney, 2nd Baronet (died 1706)
