= Henry Brockman (colonist) =

Early settler of North America

Henry Brockman (1622 or 1623 – c. 1690s) was an early colonist to Maryland and founder of a large family in the United States.

== Genealogical accounts ==
Many accounts have been generated over the years regarding Henry and his origins. It is clear in court records in Maryland that Henry was born about 1647 and he arrives in court to prove that his age is 20 years at 1667, which was required to by law for indentured servants at that time. The oral tradition in the family over the generations was that Henry was English rather than German, (the German lines of the family that emigrated through Pennsylvania and New York). Henry's story was published by William Everett Brockman in many books through small publishers, or privately, that are now out of print. His first, "The Brockman Family Scrapbook" was the most widely circulated and contained any anecdote or record that the author could find. He subsequently refuted many of these anecdotes and published a more accurate account in "History of the Families of Virginia vol. IV" and other works. However, the first book seems to have been one of the most widely circulated and has generated a lot of conflicting and misleading material that has been published on the web. This ranges from Henry being a knight 1 to Henry having parents named Thomas and Amey Brookman who died on Barbados [2]. The following account is from William Everett Brockman's later works with some revisions by current genealogists who have re-investigated records in Maryland and Kent UK to correct some minor errors.

== Most widely accepted immigration story ==
Example: Papers of Indenture

Henry was Orphaned during the commonwealth period in England and apparently exiled by Cromwell's Roundheads, as a result of his closest relatives activities as royalists. He either fled or was sent to the "Barbadoes", a British possession embracing not only the present island nation of Barbados, but also other possessions now known as Aruba and Surinam among others that were transferred to the Dutch in or about 1667.

Henry left the Barbadoes, indenturing himself to Captain John Jourdaine, for transport to Maryland the only colony at that time in which religious freedom was assured. He later married Rebecca Samuell, a daughter or niece of the owners of the "Samuell & Mary" on which Captain Jourdaine had transported Henry to Maryland. Some estimate that Rebecca and Henry today have generated thousands of descendants in the USA and hundreds who still carry the Brockman surname. Henry shows up in court documents in Maryland testifying that his age was 20 years in the spring of 1667. In 1674 he is in court again, to document that he had worked off payment for his passage to Maryland, received title to his headright (property given to colonists), and sold that property. He appears to have moved to Virginia, and to have conceived his son Samuell Brockman shortly thereafter. According to legends preserved in several branches of the family, he died (apparently in a shipwreck or shipbourn accident) while returning to England to claim the inheritance which had been denied him in 1658. His death occurred shortly after 1690. It is perhaps ironic that Henry's grandsons and great-grandsons became patriots in the US revolutionary war, and fought against royalists for a republican cause (see John Brockman Jr.), however, this accurately reflects the experiences of many of the Cavaliers in Virginia.

While this immigration story has been widely published in small release books, it is not without controversy. Various genealogists contend that there is a lack of definitive documentation relating Henry to the English Brockman family of Kent. And in fact, there is no definitive evidence of the Kentish background for Henry, only the oral traditions of the family. There are also some conflicting stories, as recorded in the scrapbooks.
