= Walmer Castle =

Castle in Kent

- Walmer, England
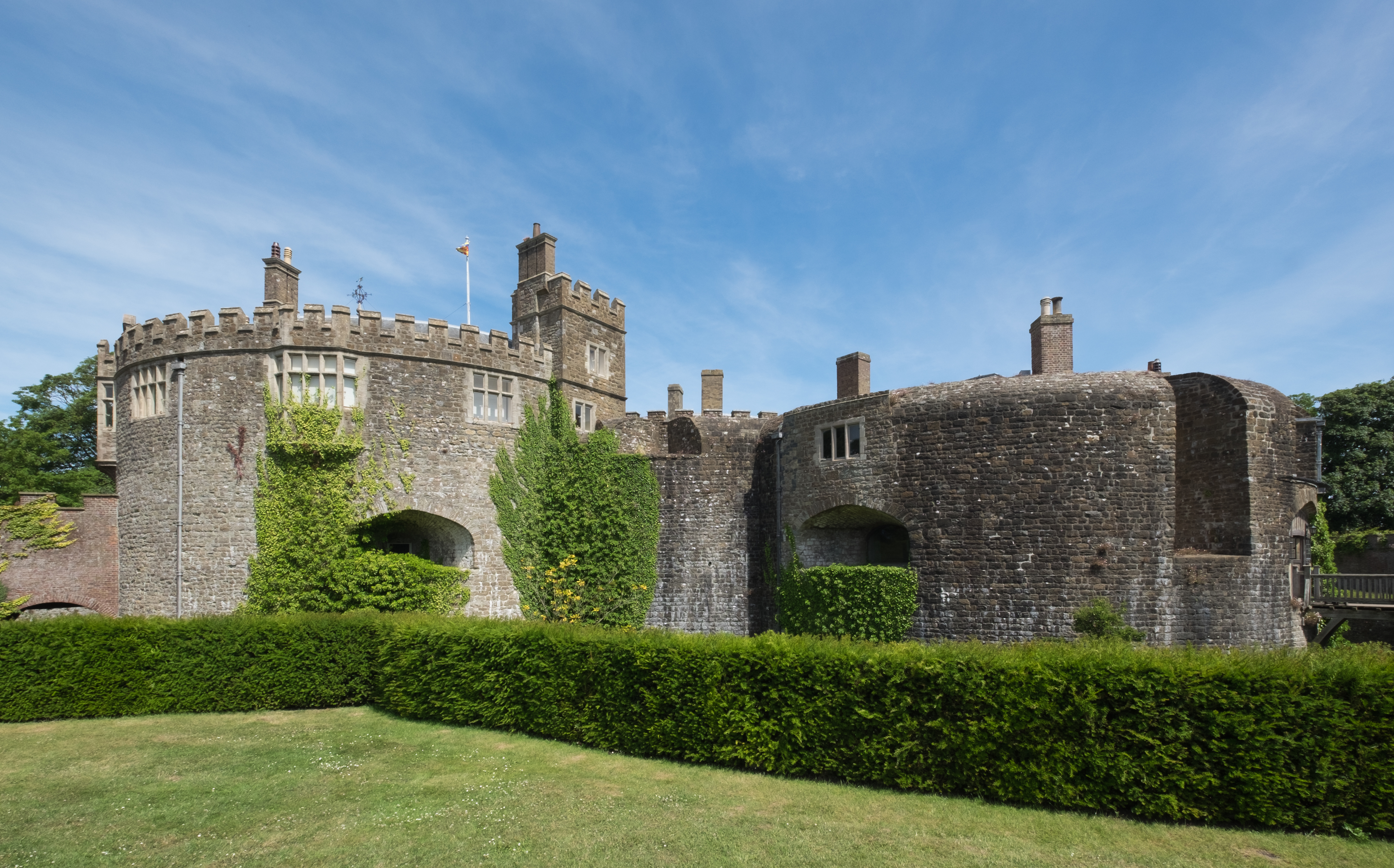
- The castle from the east in 2018

Site information
- Type: Device Fort
- Owner: English Heritage
- Open to the public: Yes

Location
- Coordinates: 51°12′04″N 1°24′08″E

Site history
- Built: 1539
- Events: English Civil War; Napoleonic Wars

Scheduled monument
- Official name: Artillery castle at Walmer
- Designated: 19 October 1981
- Reference no.: 1013381

National Register of Historic Parks and Gardens
- Official name: Walmer Castle
- Designated: 1 May 1986
- Reference no.: 1000291

Walmer Castle is an artillery fort originally constructed by Henry VIII in Walmer, Kent, between 1539 and 1540. It formed part of the King's Device programme to protect against invasion from France and the Holy Roman Empire, and defended the strategically important Downs anchorage off the English coast. Comprising a keep and four circular bastions, the moated stone castle covered 0.61 acres (0.25 ha) and had 39 firing positions on the upper levels for artillery. It cost the Crown a total of £27,092 to build the three castles of Walmer, Sandown, and Deal, which lay adjacent to one another along the coast and were connected by earthwork defences. (Note: Comparing early modern costs and prices with those of the modern period is challenging. £27,092 in 1539 could be equivalent to between £15.3 million and £6,960 million in 2014, depending on the price comparison used, and £174 to between £98,000 and £44 million. For comparison, the total royal expenditure on all the Device Forts across England between 1539–47 came to £376,500, with St Mawes Castle, for example, costing £5,018, and Sandgate Castle £5,584. £500 in 1648 could be equivalent to between £60,300 and £16.7 million.) The original invasion threat passed, but during the Second English Civil War of 1648–49, Walmer was seized by pro-Royalist insurgents and was only retaken by Parliamentary forces after several months' fighting.

In the 18th century, Walmer became the official residence of the Lord Warden of the Cinque Ports and was gradually modified from a military fortification into a private residence. Various Prime Ministers and prominent politicians were appointed as Lord Warden, including William Pitt, the Duke of Wellington and Lord Granville, who adapted parts of the Tudor castle as living spaces and constructed extensive gardens around the property. By 1904, the War Office agreed that Walmer had no remaining military utility and it passed to the Ministry of Works. Successive Lord Wardens continued to use the property but it was also opened to the public. Walmer was no longer considered a particularly comfortable or modern residence, however, and Lord Curzon blamed the poor condition of the castle for his wife's death in 1906.

Lord Wardens since the Second World War have included Winston Churchill, Robert Menzies and Queen Elizabeth The Queen Mother, but they have made only intermittent use of Walmer Castle. In the 21st century, Walmer Castle is run as a tourist attraction by English Heritage. The interior of the castle displays a range of historical objects and pictures associated with the property and its Lord Wardens, protected since the 19th century by special legislation. The grounds include the Queen Mother's Garden, designed by Penelope Hobhouse as a 95th birthday gift for Elizabeth in 1997.

== History ==
=== 16th century ===
Walmer Castle was built to defend the English coast from attack by France and the Holy Roman Empire in the final years of the reign of King Henry VIII. Traditionally the Crown had left coastal defences to the local lords and communities, only taking a modest role in building and maintaining fortifications, and while France and the Empire remained in conflict with one another, maritime raids were common but an actual invasion of England seemed unlikely. Modest defences, based around simple blockhouses and towers, existed in the south-west and along the Sussex coast, with a few more impressive works in the north of England, but in general the fortifications were very limited in scale.

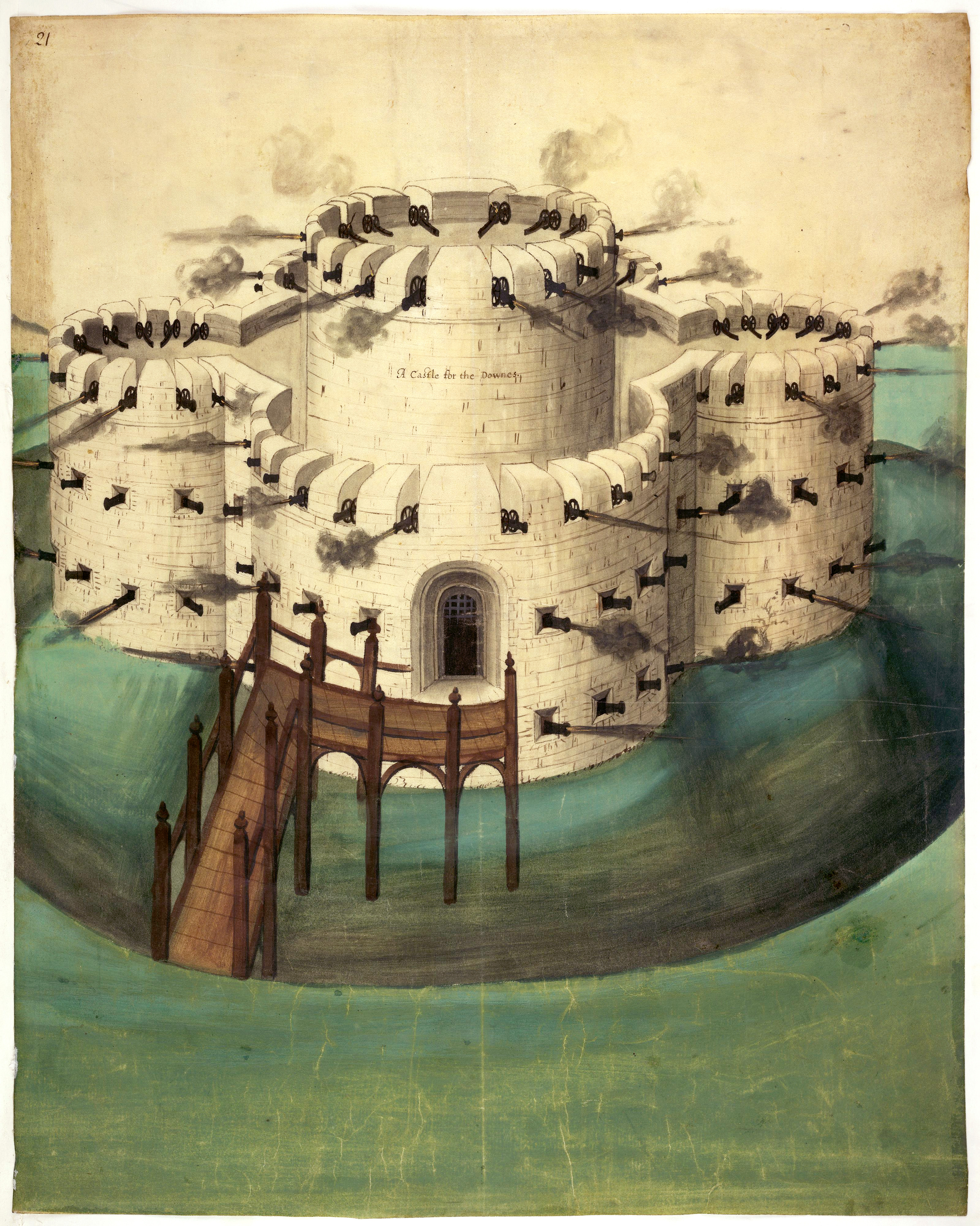
A 1539 early design for either Walmer or nearby Sandown Castle

In 1533, Henry broke with Pope Paul III in order to annul the long-standing marriage to his wife, Catherine of Aragon and remarry. Catherine was the aunt of Charles V, Holy Roman Emperor, and he took the annulment as a personal insult. This resulted in France and the Empire declaring an alliance against Henry in 1538, and the Pope encouraging the two countries to attack England. An invasion of England appeared certain. In response, Henry issued an order, called a "device", in 1539, giving instructions for the "defence of the realm in time of invasion" and the construction of forts along the English coastline.

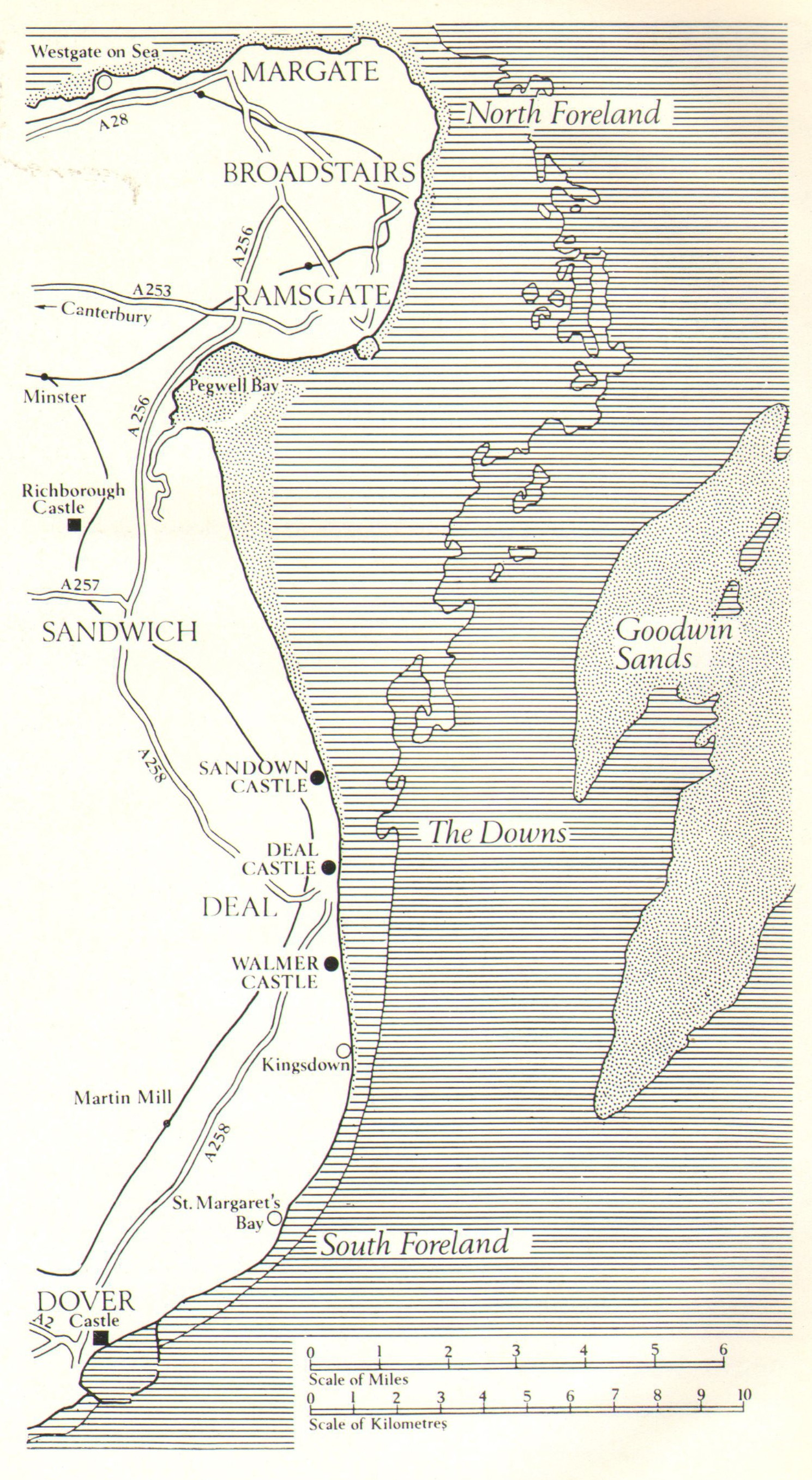
Map of Deal Walmer and Sandown Castles, "The three castles which keep the Downs"

Walmer and the adjacent castles of Deal and Sandown were constructed to protect the Downs in east Kent, an important anchorage formed by the Goodwin Sands which gave access to Deal Beach, on which enemy soldiers could easily be landed. The stone castles were supported by a line of four earthwork forts, known as the Great Turf, the Little Turf Bulwark, the Great White Bulwark of Clay and the Walmer Bulwark, and a 2.5-mile-long (4.0 km) defensive ditch and bank. Collectively the castles became known as the "castles of the Downs" and cost the Crown a total of £27,092 to build.

Walmer was built between April 1539 and autumn 1540, by a team including Richard Benese as the surveyor, William Clement as the master carpenter, and Christopher Dickenson as the master mason. It was initially garrisoned by a captain, two lieutenants, two porters, ten gunners and three soldiers, at an annual cost of £174. It was probably equipped with a range of brass and cast-iron guns, along with arquebuses and bows for close defence. In 1597, a report listed the castle's artillery as comprising a cannon, a culverin, five demi-culverins, a saker, a minion and a falcon.

=== 17th century ===
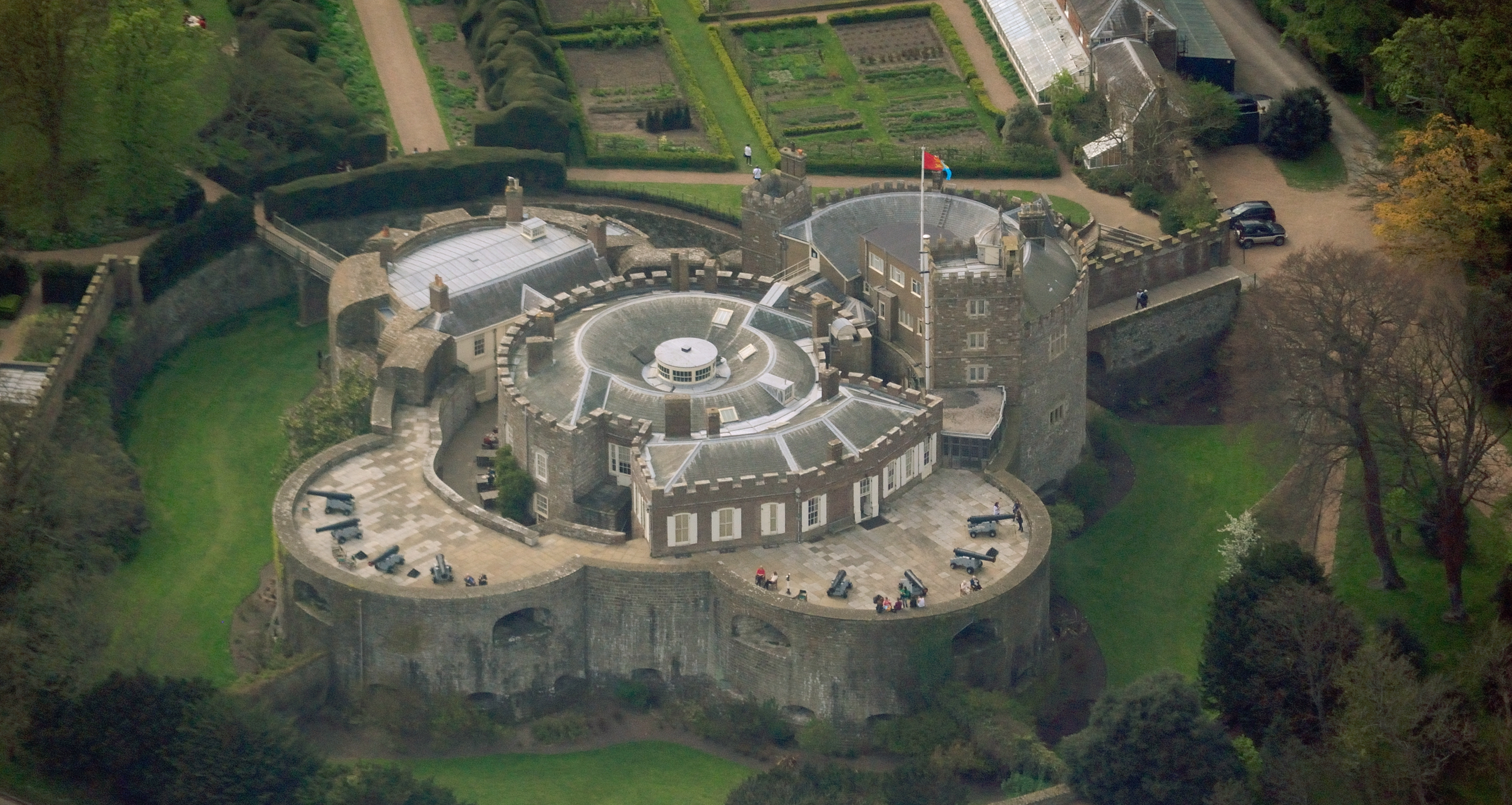
Aerial view of the castle seen from the north-east, showing the later alterations to the upper storeys, with the gatehouse to the upper right

Walmer Castle was left to decline in the early 17th century, with little money being made available for repairs and the garrison receiving low pay, leading some members to reside in nearby Deal rather the fort itself, and to take on additional employment to supplement their wages. Walmer Castle was seized by Parliamentary forces at the start of the first English Civil War between the supporters of King Charles I and Parliament, but did not play a significant role in the remainder of the initial conflict. After the few years of unsteady peace after 1645, the Second Civil War broke out in 1648, this time with Charles' Royalist supporters joined by Scottish allies. The Parliamentary navy was based in the Downs, protected by Walmer and the other Henrician castles, but by May a Royalist insurrection was under way across Kent.

Vice-Admiral William Batten had been forced to resign from his post as Commander of the Fleet the previous year by Parliamentary officials, and he now encouraged the fleet to join the Royalist faction. Sir Henry Palmer, a former sailor, accompanied by other members of the Kentish gentry, also called on the fleet to revolt, taking advantage of the many fellow Kentish men in the crews. Walmer and Deal Castle declared for the King, shortly after the garrisons at Sandown. With both the coastal fortresses and the navy now under Royalist control, Parliament feared that foreign forces might be landed along the coast or aid sent to the Scots.

Parliament defeated the wider insurgency at the Battle of Maidstone at the start of June, and then sent a force under the command of Colonel Nathaniel Rich to deal with Walmer and the other castles along the Downs. Walmer Castle was the first to be besieged, and surrendered on 12 July. Deal was attacked in late July, and in August artillery assaults began on Sandown as well, leading to the surrender of both remaining fortifications. Walmer was badly damaged during the conflict and it was estimated by Rich, responsible for carrying out the repairs, that the work would cost at least £500.

In 1649, Parliament ordered new supplies of ammunition and powder be sent to Walmer and the other castles of the Downs, which were brought back into good order. The garrison at Walmer remained substantial during the period, with a governor, a corporal and 20 soldiers, but when Charles II was restored to the throne in 1660 he reduced the numbers again to a captain, lieutenant, porter and 16 men. In the Glorious Revolution of 1688 against Charles' brother, King James II, the townsfolk of Deal seized Walmer Castle on behalf of William III, the Prince of Orange. By the end of the century, however, the castle was increasingly regarded as out of date from a military perspective.

=== 18th–19th centuries ===
==== 1700–1828 ====
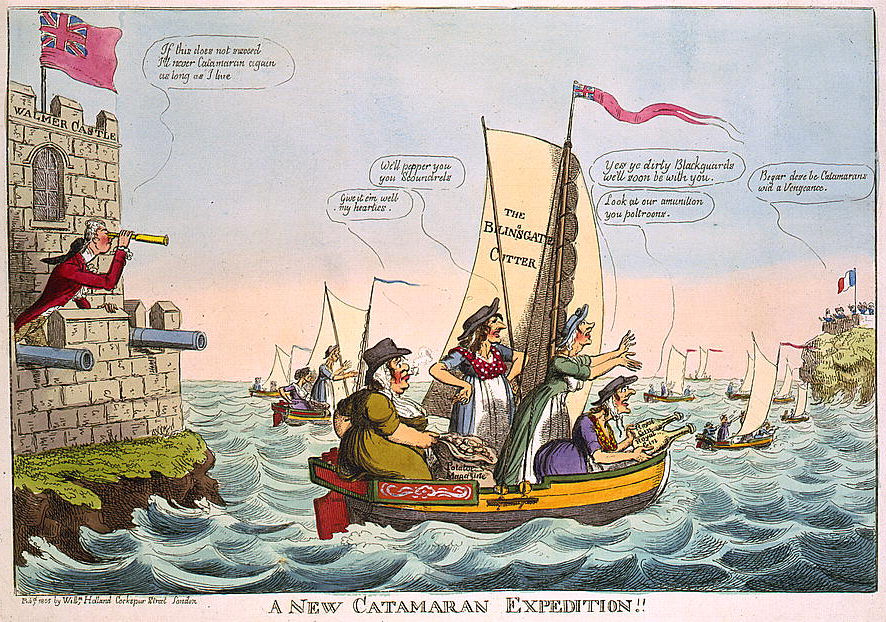
A satirical cartoon of 1805, depicting William Pitt the Younger directing operations against the French from Walmer Castle (left)

In the 18th century, Walmer Castle became the official residence of the Lord Warden of the Cinque Ports. The Lord Warden was originally a medieval title linked to five key ports along the coast of England; the position's prominence had faded, but it still retained important judicial and military functions. When Lionel Sackville, 1st Duke of Dorset, was appointed to the post in 1708 he decided that the existing residence in Dover Castle was unsatisfactory, probably because of the semi-ruinous state of the castle, and moved into Walmer Castle instead.

The Duke occupied the post of Lord Warden until 1765, save for two periods when it was filled by James Butler, 2nd Duke of Ormonde and John Sidney, 6th Earl of Leicester. He carried out extensive work to make the castle more habitable, building extensions towards the north bastion and constructing a small house in the south bastion for the soldiers. Under the subsequent Lord Wardens, the politicians Robert Darcy, 4th Earl of Holderness, and Francis North, 1st Earl of Guilford, the castle continued to house artillery but it became increasingly less military in character.

The Prime Minister William Pitt the Younger was then made the Lord Warden in 1792. Pitt was badly in debt and King George III believed that the post, which came with a salary of £3,000 a year, would usefully supplement Pitt's income. (Note: Comparing 18th century costs and prices with those of the modern period depends on the measure used. £3,000 in 1792 could be equivalent to between £326,000 and £23.4 million in 2014, depending on the price comparison used.) Pitt made extensive use of the castle and by 1803 he used it as his main residence in an effort to reduce his living costs. Pitt's niece, Lady Hester Stanhope, joined him at Walmer between 1803 and 1806; together with Pitt, she carried out extensive work on the castle gardens, transforming them from a simple kitchen garden into a set of landscaped ornamental enclosures; Stanhope enlisted the Dover militia to help with the landscaping and planting.

With the outbreak of the French Revolutionary Wars, Pitt became energetically involved in the protection of the ports along the coast, entertaining the local garrison commanders, naval captains and the local gentry at Walmer on a regular basis. After Pitt resigned as prime minister in 1801, fears remained of a French invasion and he formed a volunteer cavalry unit at Walmer Castle, where he lived with his new officers. He also formed a unit of bombardier infantry and a fleet of 35 fishing boats called luggers, which he armed with 12-pound (5.4 kg) or 18-pound (8.2 kg) guns, reviewing them from the castle. Stanhope remarked on the constant drilling of army units around the castle during her time there.

Robert Jenkinson, 2nd Earl of Liverpool, took possession of Walmer Castle following the death of Pitt in 1806. Liverpool was a favourite of King George's, and his appointment as Lord Warden was again intended to provide a valuable income and a country retreat. As prime minister, Liverpool used Walmer as a personal retreat and as a location for private political discussions with selected guests.

==== 1829–99 ====
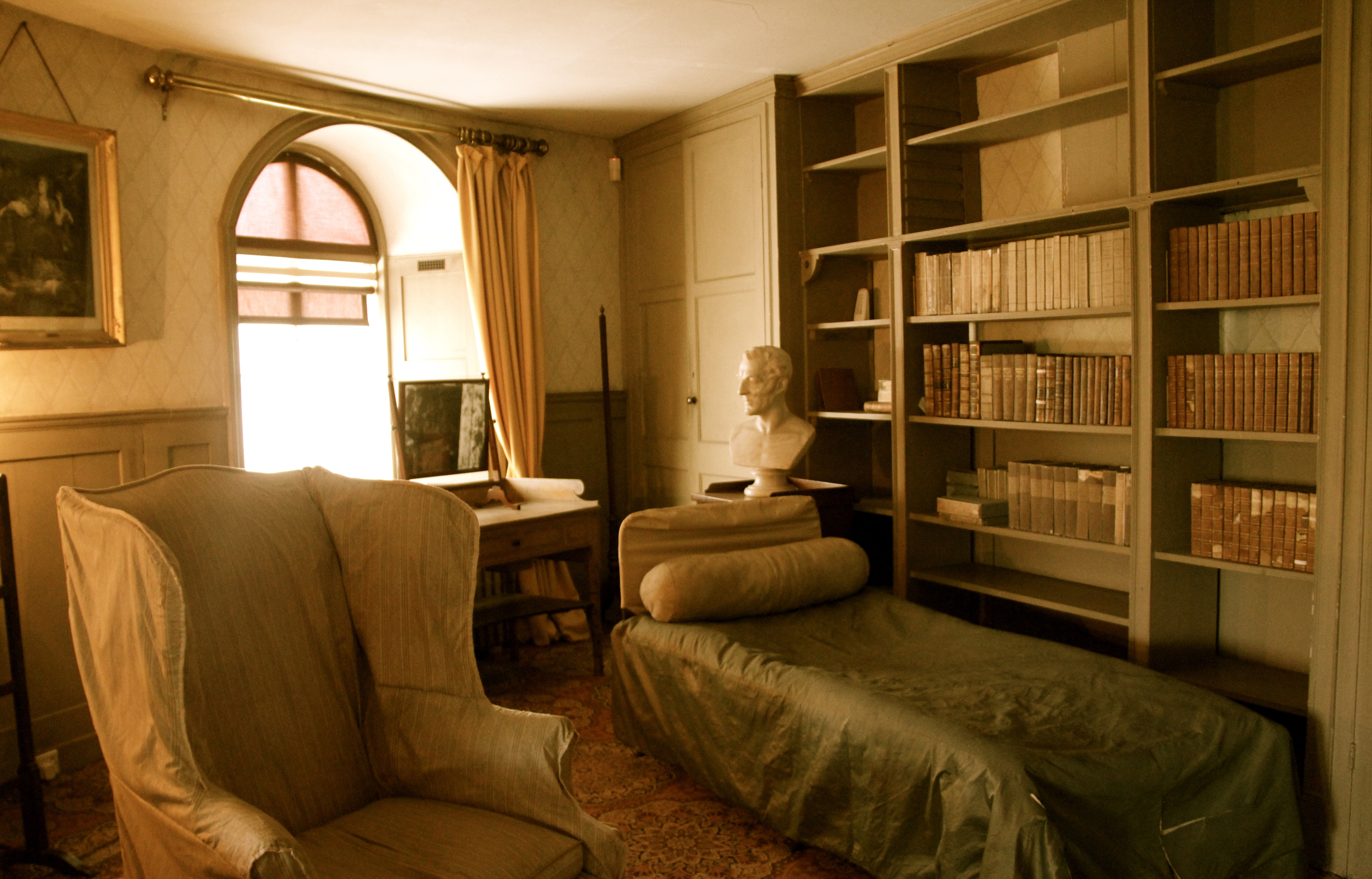
The Duke of Wellington's room, including his original chair and camp bed

On Lord Liverpool's death in 1828, Arthur Wellesley, 1st Duke of Wellington and the prime minister at the time, asked King George IV for the post of Lord Warden, primarily because he was seeking the use of Walmer Castle. Wellington took up post in 1829 and considered Walmer to be "the most charming marine residence". He made use of the castle each autumn, entertaining extensively there but living and sleeping in a single room. He was visited there twice by Victoria, once when she was still a princess and later as queen. Wellington let the gardens fall into a poor condition. Wellington died in his room at Walmer on 14 September 1852. His embalmed body was kept in his room to lie in state until 10 November, and when the room was opened for public visitors during the final two days, around 9,000 attended. The Duke's body was finally removed to London via Deal, complete with a military escort.

James Broun-Ramsay, 1st Marquess of Dalhousie became Lord Warden; on his death, the prime minister Henry John Temple, 3rd Viscount Palmerston, took over the castle in 1861. Palmerston initially declined to buy the contents of the castle from his predecessor's estate on taking up the post, a practice which had become traditional for the Lords Warden, complaining about the high price being proposed. This raised the risk that the historical contents of the castle might be sold off at open auction; and some of Wellington's former belongings were therefore removed by his family for safekeeping.

The politician Granville Leveson-Gower, 2nd Earl Granville was offered the post of Lord Warden by the new prime minister, Lord Russell in 1865. Russell noted that the role would be expensive for Granville to perform — the salary had been abolished in 1828 — but that it would provide him with a property by the sea, which Granville had been seeking to acquire for a while. Granville took over Walmer in 1865. He expanded the gardens, built new kennels for a hunting pack and spent many years reassembling the furniture and other objects that Pitt and Wellington had used at the castle. He received large numbers of visitors, many of whom stopped off while travelling to or from France. The diplomat Baron de Malortie visited Granville and his family at Walmer, and later praised the homely atmosphere in the castle. He described how, after breakfast, the family and guests would all gather in the drawing room, which was the only large room in the house, and Granville would answer government correspondence amid the daily life of the rest of the household.

The businessman and politician William Smith was appointed Lord Warden in 1891, but died in Walmer Castle during his first visit here in October of that year. Smith had proposed that the historical artefacts in the castle should be protected from being removed by later Lord Wardens and suggested that government pass an Indenture of Heirlooms Bill. The government carried out the plan after Smith's death, protecting almost 70 pieces of furniture and 50 artworks at the castle and forbidding them being moved from the castle without the Secretary of State for War's approval. Robert Gascoyne-Cecil, 3rd Marquess of Salisbury, became the next Lord Warden; with adequate legal protection now in place, the 3rd Duke of Wellington suggested returning his grandfather's possessions to the castle, but Lady Salisbury declined the offer.

=== 20th–21st centuries ===
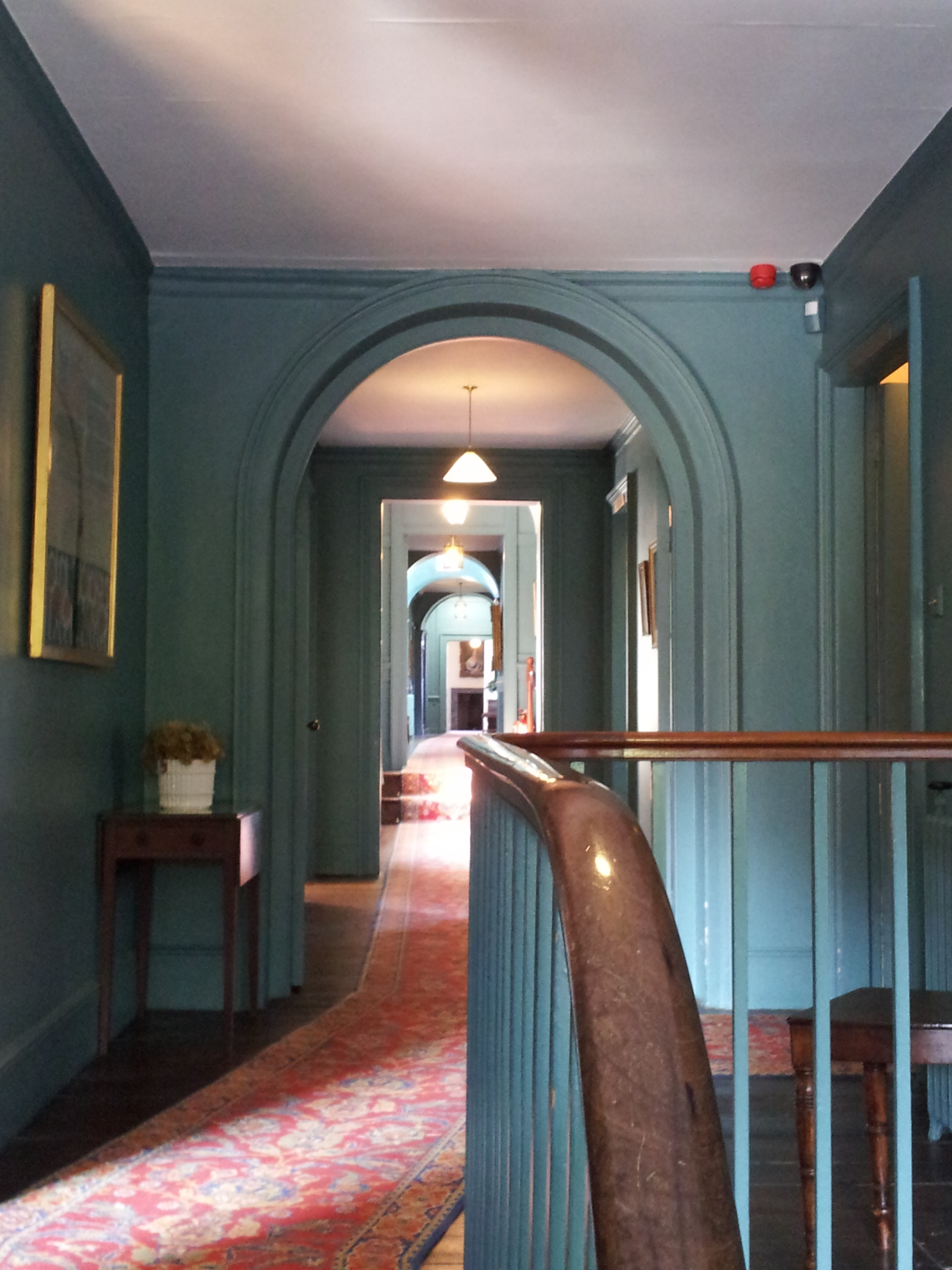
The central corridor on the first floor of the castle, looking north

By 1904 the War Office had concluded that Walmer had no remaining military value and agreed to transfer the castle to the Office of Works, who accepted it on the condition that they were paid £2,400 in order to carry out repairs. (Note: The equivalent value of early 20th century money in the modern period depends on the measure used. £2,400 in 1903 could be equivalent to between £241,000 and £2.3 million in 2014, depending on the price comparison used.) The Office's survey noted that "the lower floor ... is very inconvenient, dark and not conducive to health while the women servants have to sleep in a sort of dormitory in the slopes of the roof... The principal floor is, generally speaking, badly arranged and badly lighted and the Dining Room is very small"; the report suggested that it would be best to demolish the building and rebuild it.

Proposals were made to find the next Lord Warden, George Curzon, 1st Marquess Curzon of Kedleston, alternative accommodation and the Royal Marines were approached as replacement tenants for the castle, but declined the offer. The ministry acquired agreement for most of the castle to be opened to the public, with various historical objects related to the property being put on display, including some donated by King Edward VII. Lord Curzon moved into the castle when returned from India in 1905. His wife, Mary, fell ill, which Curzon believed to be a result of their poor accommodation, and despite being moved to a new residence, she died shortly afterwards. As a result, Curzon decided to resign the post of Lord Warden, leaving the castle, and subsequently the Prince of Wales, the future George V, took up the post.

William Lygon, 7th Earl Beauchamp, became the Lord Warden in 1913, building a Roman Catholic chapel at the castle and holding large parties there each summer. His children later commented that they found the castle was chilly and cramped. The prime minister, H. H. Asquith, was invited by Beauchamp to use the castle during the First World War as a weekend retreat, as it had good communication links with the front line in France. Asquith's wife, Margot, was not initially impressed by Walmer, noting in her diary that while it was "very distinguished" and had "great charm", it was "terribly exposed" with "cold... noisy corridors and small rooms"; she later came to like the castle and noted that she was sad to finally leave it.

Lygon had sexual relations with men, which was illegal in England during this period. Rumours spread about the parties that he had held at Walmer Castle after the war, where, according to the historian Richard Davenport-Hines, he had "behaved indiscreetly with young men". The King was informed about his lifestyle and Lygon fled the country in 1931, resigning the appointment of Lord Warden the following year.

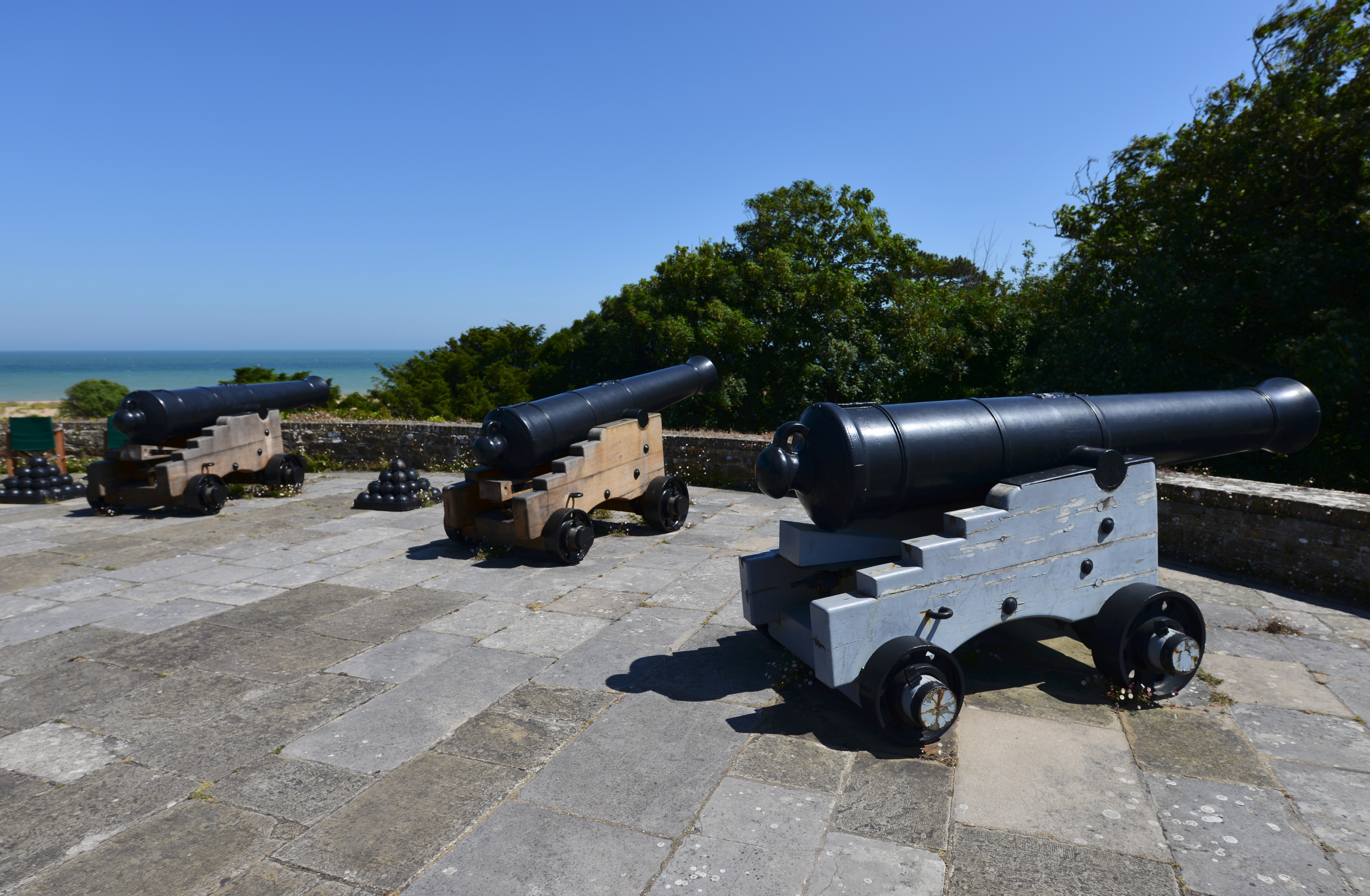
Three cannons on one of the castle's firing platforms

Lygon's successor, the politician Rufus Isaacs, 1st Marquess of Reading, became the Lord Warden in 1934, holding jovial family gatherings there. His wife, Stella, attempted to restore Wellington's old bedroom to its earlier appearance during the Duke's tenure and, as part of this project, the 4th Duke of Wellington agreed to send the original contents of the room back to the castle, where they still remain. The politician Freeman Freeman-Thomas, 1st Marquess of Willingdon, became Lord Warden in 1936, followed by Sir Winston Churchill who followed him in 1941 during the Second World War. Churchill noted to the Minister of Works and Buildings that he had told King George V on taking up the position that he doubted that he would be able to live at Walmer Castle during the war, as it was within range of the German artillery along the French coast, or indeed that he would able to afford to live there afterwards, and for that reason he hoped that the state would maintain the castle and gardens, and decide what use it should be put to after the war.

Sir Robert Menzies, the Australian politician, became the Lord Warden in 1965 and visited the castle on an annual basis, staying in the flat there. Queen Elizabeth the Queen Mother followed Menzies in 1978, initially visiting the castle from the Royal Yacht HMY Britannia, but from 1986 onwards taking over the entire castle for three days each July. This required moving furniture, silverware and other furnishings from London and caused difficulties for English Heritage, who managed the property. Admiral of the Fleet Michael Boyce, Baron Boyce, took up the post of Lord Warden in 2004. Since his death on 6 November 2022 the post was vacant until June 2024, when Sir George Zambellas became the current Lord Warden.

In the 21st century, the property is managed by English Heritage, attracting 152,391 visitors in 2019. English Heritage carried out a £674,000 programme of improvements to the castle in 2015 intended to improve the visitor experience. The castle is protected under UK law as a scheduled monument, while the surrounding gardens are protected with a grade II listing.

== Architecture ==
=== Castle ===
Plan of the ground floor of the castle; key: A - gatehouse; B - porter's lodge; C - gunpowder store; D - servant's hall E - Hall Room; F - Gunners' Lodging; G - Willingdon Room; H - Sackville Room

Walmer Castle retains most of its original 16th-century structure, with a tall keep, 83 feet (25 m) across, at the centre, flanked by four rounded bastions, one of which served as a gatehouse, and a moat, surrounded in turn by a curtain wall. Its curved walls are 15 feet (4.6 m) thick. It was nearly identical to its sister castle at Sandown and was approximately 167 by 167 feet (51 by 51 m) across, covering 0.61 acres (0.25 ha). The historian John Hale considered the original castle to form a transitional design between older medieval English designs and newer Italian styles of defence.

The castle had three tiers of artillery – the heaviest and longest range weapons occupying the upper levels, including the keep – with a total of 39 firing positions, and 31 gunloops in the basement for handguns should close defence be required. The embrasures in the walls were all widely splayed to provide the maximum possible space for the guns to operate and traverse, and the interior of the castle was designed with vents to allow the smoke from its guns to escape.

From the 18th century onwards, the interior of the castle was converted to provide accommodation for the Lord Wardens, almost all of which is now open to visitors. The castle is still entered through the ground floor of the gatehouse in the western bastion, which contains the original porter's lodge. In the middle of the castle is the keep, which originally housed the Servants' Hall and now a set of tea rooms. In the southern bastion is a set of rooms which are reached through the Hall Room, originally built as gunners' lodgings in the 18th century and converted into the entrance hall to the castle in the 1930s. On the far side of the bastion are the Sackville and Willingdon Rooms, built in the 18th century; the Willingdon Room is now used as a museum for objects relating to William Pitt. The Lucas Room has been redecorated in a mid-19th century style and is used to present various items of Wellington memorabilia. The north and east bastions are filled in, providing solid foundations for the gun platforms above.

The second floor contains the Lord Warden's private apartments in the west bastion and the western half of the keep. In the southern bastion is the Duke of Wellington's Room and the Lucas Room, originally part of an apartment of rooms selected by William Pitt for his use, as they formed the warmest part of the castle. The corridor running across the castle through the keep was built by Pitt to link the north and south halves of the castle.

The Prince Consort's and Queen Victoria's rooms in the keep are named after their use during the royal visit of 1842, although their decoration today dates from the interwar period. The Dining Room, Drawing Room and Ante Room, which overlook the northern bastion, date from the 1730s, when the Duke of Dorset constructed them to form a private set of chambers. These rooms feature a range of pink and purple window glass, which tradition says was installed by the Earl of Liverpool to protect his wife's eyesight; recent analysis shows that some of the pink-tinted glass dates from the 1730s, and discoloured naturally over time, while other panes were intentionally purchased around 1800 in these hues, but probably as status symbols and not for any medical purpose.

=== Gardens ===
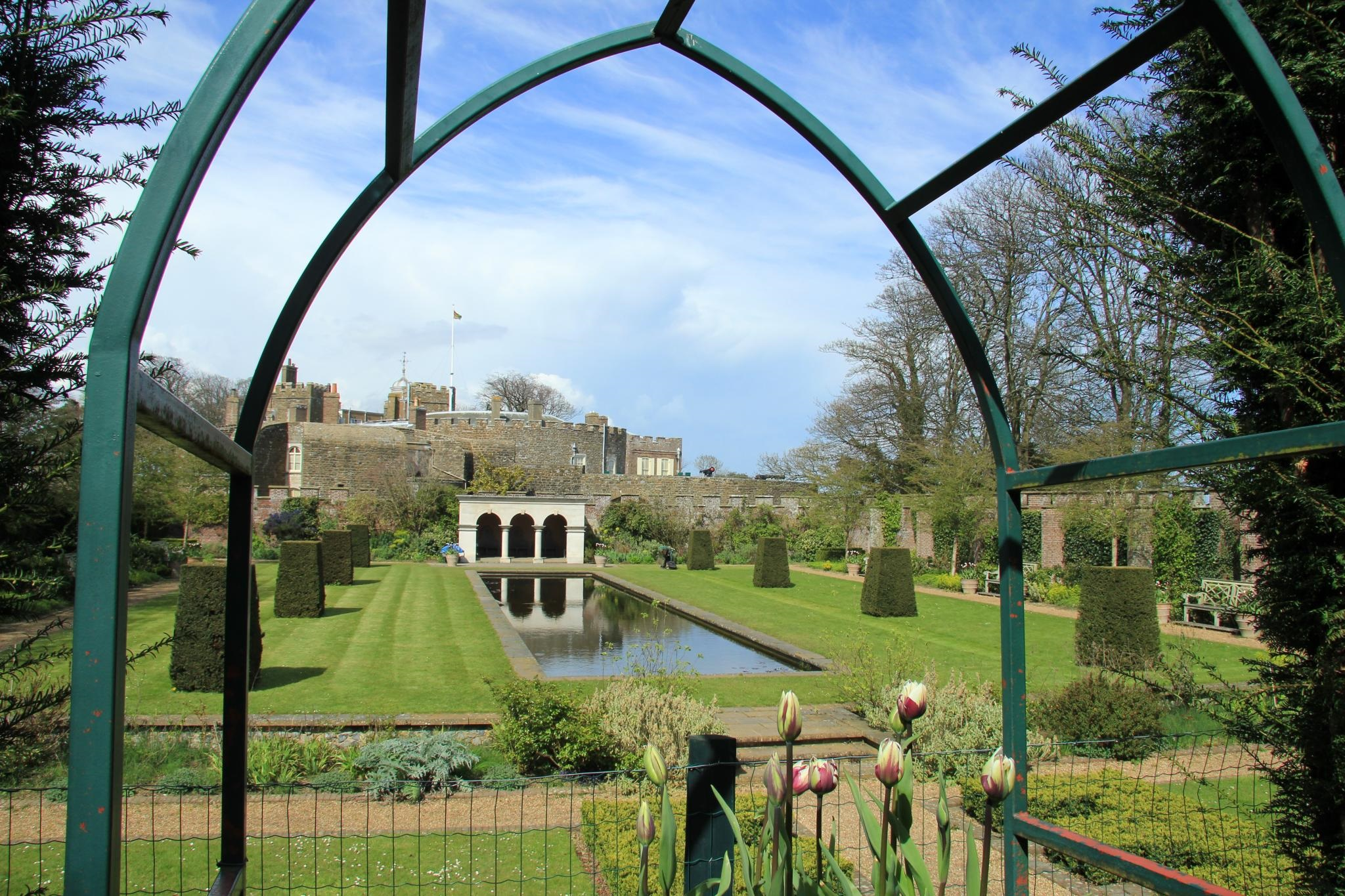
The Queen Mother's Garden

The gardens of Walmer Castle date mainly from the 1790s and 1860s and comprise around 32 acres (13 ha) of land, split evenly between formal ornamental gardens and parkland. The main body of the gardens stretches away from the castle towards the north-west, and is made up of protected, well-drained, chalk-based soil, forming a maritime microclimate.

The castle is approached through the castle meadow, an area of open parkland, lined with holm oaks planted in the 1860s, and is surrounded by the dry moat, now a garden dating from at least the 1850s and planted with trees and shrubs. Adjacent to the castle are the Queen Mother's Garden and the kitchen garden and glasshouses. The Queen Mother's Garden was built by English Heritage as a 95th birthday gift for the then Lord Warden in 1997, the site having been originally part of the wider kitchen gardens, before being turned into a tennis court in the 1920s. Designed by Penelope Hobhouse, the garden incorporates a 92-foot-long (28 m) pool, a viewing mound and a classical pavilion. The two glasshouses have been restored, functioning as cold greenhouses, while the remainder of the kitchen garden is planted with a mixture of vegetables, fruit trees and flowers.

The 262-foot-long (80 m) Broadwalk is the main axis of the gardens and separates the glasshouses from the 328-foot-long (100 m) Oval Lawn, planted with lime trees and yews. The Broadwalk is lined by the "Cloud Hedge", a formal 19th-century yew hedge that grew out of control in the Second World War and was left in its current, undulating style. Two terraces in the middle of the garden, designed by William Masters in an Italianate style, separate the further half of the garden. On the other side are the paddock, planted with holm oaks, and a curved belt of woodland of beech, ash and chestnut trees, badly damaged in the storms of 1987 and 1990. At the far end is the Glen, a woodland hollow formed from an old chalk quarry in the 19th century.

== See also ==
- Castles in Great Britain and Ireland

== Bibliography ==
- Ashton, Robert (1994). Counter-revolution: The Second Civil War and Its Origins, 1646–8. Avon, UK: The Bath Press. ISBN 9780300061147.
- Biddle, Martin; Hiller, Jonathon; Scott, Ian; Streeten, Anthony (2001). Henry VIII's Coastal Artillery Fort at Camber Castle, Rye, East Sussex: An Archaeological Structural and Historical Investigation. Oxford, UK: Oxbow Books. ISBN 0904220230.
- Brock, Michael; Brock, Eleanor (2014). Margot Asquith's Great War Diary 1914-1916: The View from Downing Street. Oxford, UK: Oxford University Press. ISBN 9780198229773.
- Brock, W. R. (2014) [1941]. Lord Liverpool and Liberal Toryism. Cambridge, UK: Cambridge University Press. ISBN 9781107425767.
- Coad, Jonathan (2008). "History of the Castle". In Lawson, Susannah (ed.). Walmer Castle and Gardens. London, UK: English Heritage. pp. 24–36. ISBN 978-1-85074-726-0.
- Churchill, Winston S. (1948). The Second World War: Volume 3, The Grand Alliance. London, UK: Cassell. OCLC 223119295.
- Dungworth, David; Girbal, Bruce (2011). "Walmer Castle, Deal, Kent: Analysis of the Glass, Technical Report". Research Department Report Series. London, UK: English Heritage. ISSN 1749-8775.
- Elvin, Charles R. S. (1890). Records of Walmer, Together with "The Three Castles that Keep the Downs". London, UK: Henry Gray. OCLC 4866519.
- Fitzmaurice, Edmond (1905a). The Life of Granville George Leveson Gower, Volume 1 (2nd ed.). London, UK: Longman, Greens and Co. OCLC 1494923.
- Fitzmaurice, Edmond (1905b). The Life of Granville George Leveson Gower, Volume 2 (2nd ed.). London, UK: Longman, Greens and Co. OCLC 1494923.
- Fry, Sebastian (2014). "A History of the National Heritage Collection: Volume Two: 1900-1913". Research Report Series. London, UK: English Heritage. ISSN 2046-9799.
- Harrington, Peter (2007). The Castles of Henry VIII. Oxford, UK: Osprey Publishing. ISBN 9781472803801.
- Hale, John R. (1983). Renaissance War Studies. London, UK: Hambledon Press. ISBN 0907628176.
- Hinze, Virginia (2008). "Tour of the Gardens and Gardens". In Lawson, Susannah (ed.). Walmer Castle and Gardens. London, UK: English Heritage. pp. 16–24. ISBN 978-1-85074-726-0.
- Jenkins, Roy (2002). Churchill. London, UK: Pan Book. ISBN 9780330488051.
- Kennedy, D. E. (1962). "The English Naval Revolt of 1648". The English Historical Review. 77 (303): 247–256. doi:10.1093/ehr/lxxvii.ccciii.247.
- King, D. J. Cathcart (1991). The Castle in England and Wales: An Interpretative History. London, UK: Routledge Press. ISBN 9780415003506.
- Maxwell, Herbert (1893). Life and Times of the Right Honourable William Henry Smith, M.P., Volume 2. Edinburgh, UK and London, UK: William Blackwood and Sons. OCLC 2488581.
- Morley, B. M. (1976). Henry VIII and the Development of Coastal Defence. London, UK: Her Majesty's Stationery Office. ISBN 0116707771.
- Muir, Rory (2015). Wellington: Waterloo and the Fortunes of Peace 1814–1852. New Haven, US: Yale University Press. ISBN 9780300214048.
- Mulvagh, Jane (2008). Madresfield: The Real Brideshead. London, UK: Doubleday. ISBN 9780385607728.
- Rutton, W. L. (1898). "Henry VIII's Castles at Sandown, Deal, Walmer, Sandgate, and Camber". Archaeologia Cantiana. 23: 24–30.
- Saunders, A. D. (1963). Deal & Walmer Castles Guidebook. Her Majesty's Stationery Office (HMSO). OCLC 1008177948.
- Saunders, Andrew (1989). Fortress Britain: Artillery Fortifications in the British Isles and Ireland. Liphook, UK: Beaufort. ISBN 1855120003.
- Shepherd, Rowena (2008). "Tour of the Castle". In Lawson, Susannah (ed.). Walmer Castle and Gardens. London, UK: English Heritage. pp. 16–24. ISBN 978-1-85074-726-0.
- Thompson, M. W. (1987). The Decline of the Castle. Cambridge, UK: Cambridge University Press. ISBN 1854226088.
- Vickers, Hugo (2006). Elizabeth, the Queen Mother. London, UK: Arrow Books. ISBN 9780099476627.
- Walton, Steven A. (2010). "State Building Through Building for the State: Foreign and Domestic Expertise in Tudor Fortification". Osiris. 25 (1): 66–84. doi:10.1086/657263. S2CID 144384757.
