= Deal Castle =

16th century artillery fort in Kent, England

- Deal, Kent
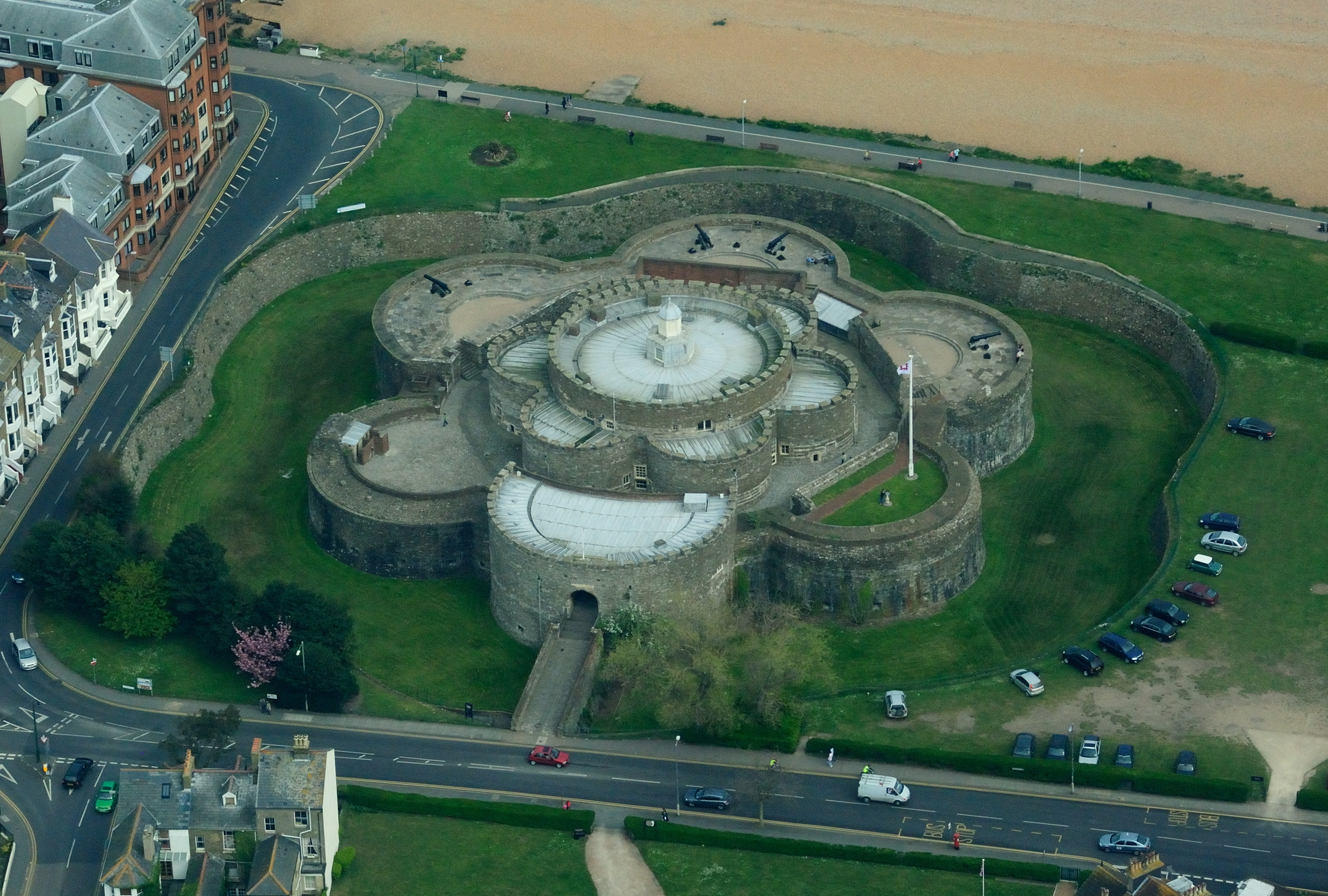
- The castle viewed from the air

Site information
- Type: Device Fort
- Owner: English Heritage
- Open to the public: Yes
- Condition: Intact

Location
- Deal Castle, shown within Kent
- Location within Kent
- Coordinates: 51°13′10″N 1°24′13″E
- Grid reference: TR 378 521

Site history
- Materials: Kentish ragstone, brick, Caen stone
- Events: Second English Civil War, Second World War

Scheduled monument
- Official name: Artillery castle at Deal
- Designated: 9 October 1981
- Reference no.: 1013380

Deal Castle is an artillery fort constructed by Henry VIII in Deal, Kent, between 1539 and 1540. It formed part of the King's Device programme to protect against invasion from France and the Holy Roman Empire, and defended the strategically important Downs anchorage off the English coast. Comprising a keep with six inner and outer bastions, the moated stone castle covered 0.85 acres (0.34 ha) and had sixty-six firing positions for artillery. It cost the Crown a total of £27,092 to build the three castles of Deal, Sandown and Walmer, which lay adjacent to one another along the coast and were connected by earthwork defences. (Note: Comparing early modern costs and prices with those of the modern period is challenging. £27,092 in 1539 could be equivalent to between £15.3 million and £6,960 million in 2014, depending on the price comparison used. For comparison, the total royal expenditure on all the Device Forts across England between 1539 and 1547 came to £376,500, with St Mawes, for example, costing £5,018, and Sandgate £5,584. £396 in 1616 could be equivalent to between £1 million and £21 million; £1,243 in 1634 to between £3 million and £52 million. £500 in 1648 could equate to between £1 million and £17 million.) The original invasion threat passed but, during the Second English Civil War of 1648–49, Deal was seized by pro-Royalist insurgents and was only retaken by Parliamentary forces after several months' fighting.

Although it remained armed, Deal was adapted by Sir John Norris and Lord Carrington during the 18th and 19th centuries to form a more suitable private house for the castle's captain, which was by now an honorary position. In 1904, the War Office concluded that the castle no longer had any value either as a defensive site or as a barracks and it was opened to the public when the captain was not in residence. Early in the Second World War, the captain's quarters were destroyed by German bombing, forcing Deal's then-captain, William Birdwood, to move to Hampton Court Palace and the castle became an observation post for an artillery battery placed along the shore line. The castle was not brought back into use as a residence and was restored by the government during the 1950s to form a tourist attraction. In the 21st century, Deal Castle is operated by English Heritage, receiving 25,256 visitors in 2008.

== History ==
=== 16th century ===
==== Background ====
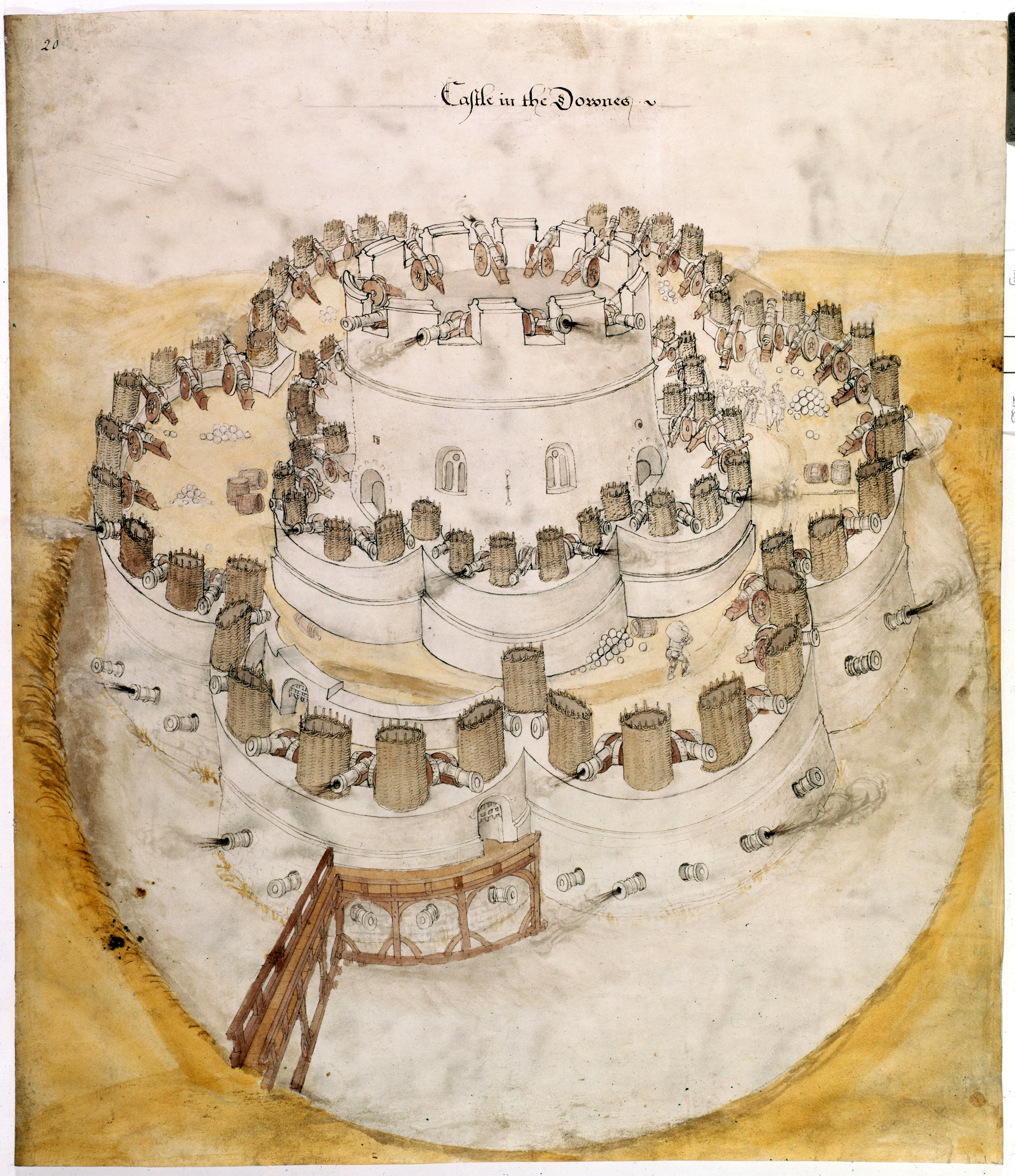
Draft 1539 plan probably shown to Henry VIII

Deal Castle was built as a consequence of international tensions between England, France and the Holy Roman Empire in the final years of the reign of King Henry VIII. Traditionally the Crown had left coastal defences to the local lords and communities, only taking a limited role in building and maintaining fortifications, and while France and the Empire remained in conflict with one another, maritime raids were common but an actual invasion of England seemed unlikely. Modest defences, based around simple blockhouses and towers, existed in the south-west and along the Sussex coast, with a few more impressive works in the north of England, but in general the fortifications were very limited in scale.

In 1533, Henry broke with Pope Paul III so as to annul the long-standing marriage to his wife, Catherine of Aragon, and remarry. Catherine was the aunt of Charles V, the Holy Roman Emperor, and he took the annulment as a personal insult. This resulted in France and the Empire declaring an alliance against Henry in 1538 and the Pope encouraging the two countries to attack England. An invasion of England appeared certain. In response, Henry issued an order, called a "device", in 1539, giving instructions for the "defence of the realm in time of invasion" and the construction of forts along the English coastline.

==== Construction ====
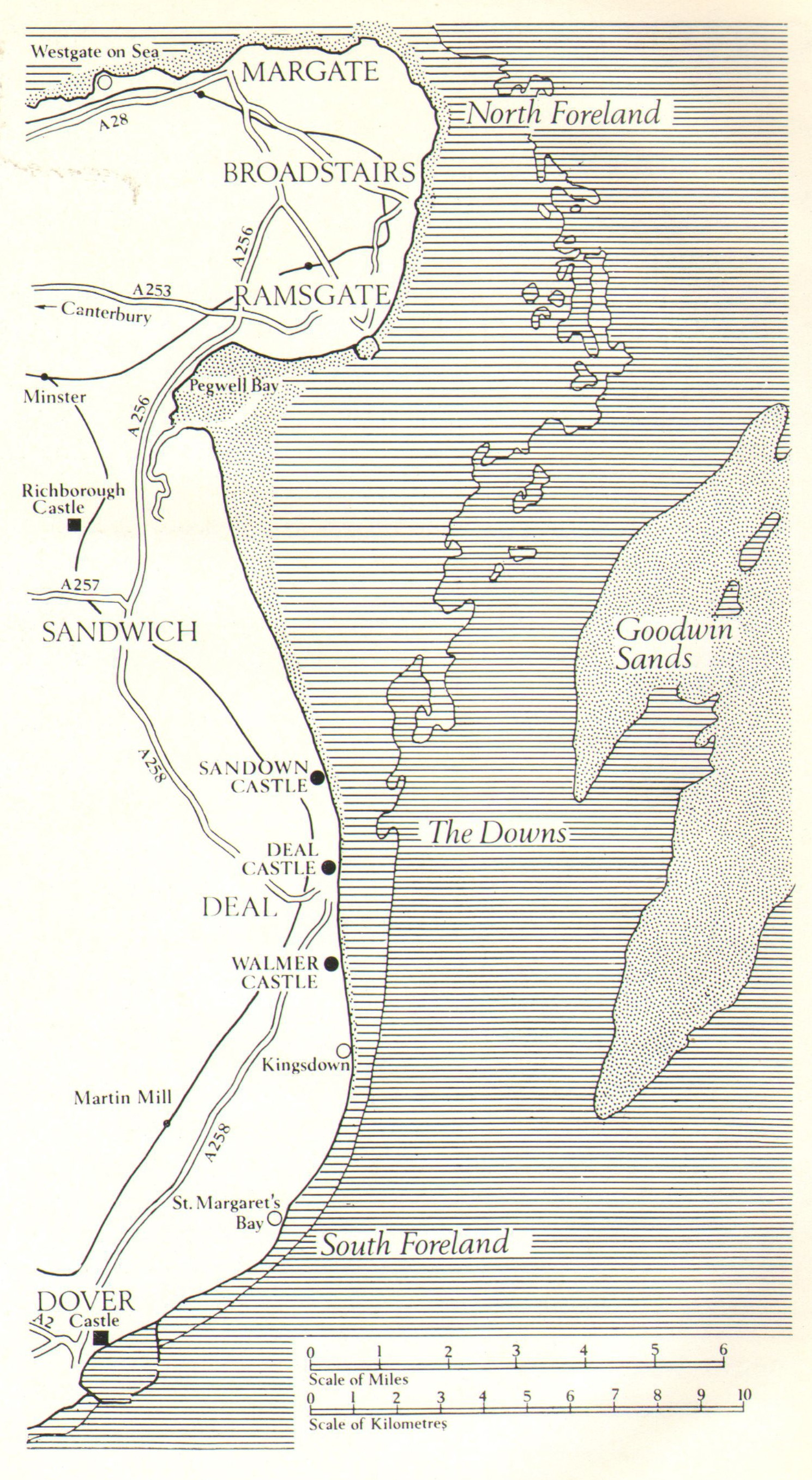
Map of Deal Walmer and Sandown Castles, "The three castles which keep the Downs"

Deal and the adjacent castles of Walmer and Sandown were constructed to protect the Downs in east Kent, an important anchorage formed by the Goodwin Sands which gave access to Deal Beach, on which enemy soldiers could easily be landed and an area the King knew well. The stone castles were supported by a line of four earthwork forts, known as the Great Turf, the Little Turf Bulwark, the Great White Bulwark of Clay and the Walmer Bulwark, and a 2.5-mile-long (4.0 km) defensive ditch and bank. Collectively the castles became known as the "castles of the Downes".

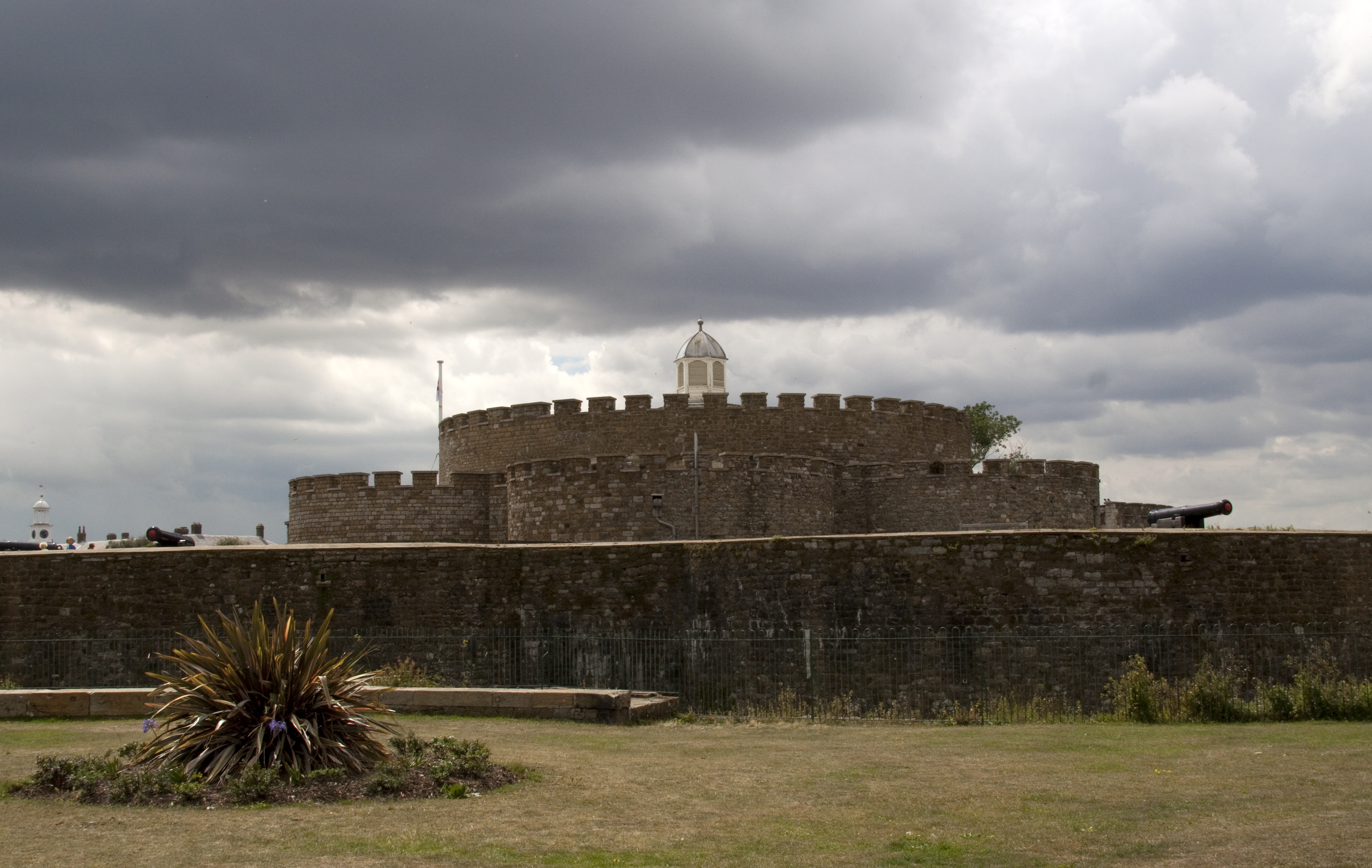
The castle from the east, showing the outer bastions, inner bastions, keep and lantern

It is not known who designed Deal Castle, but Sir Edward Ryngeley and Thomas Wingfield served as the commissioners for the project, with Robert Loyrde and David Marten as the paymaster and comptroller, and Christopher Dickenson and William Clement as the master mason and carpenters. Work began at Deal in April and progressed at speed, with 1,400 men at work on the site by the following month. A strike for higher pay was broken up over the summer by Ryngeley and by December, when Anne of Cleves dined there, the castle was mostly completed. Deal and the other fortifications along the Downs cost the Crown a total of £27,092 to build, much of which came from proceeds of the dissolution of the monasteries a few years before. Lead, timber and stone from local monasteries were also recycled for use in Deal Castle.

Wingfield became the first captain of the castle in 1540, supported by a lieutenant and overseeing a garrison of eight soldiers, sixteen gunners and two porters. He reported to the Lord Warden of the Cinque Ports.

The original invasion threat passed, but the castle was reinforced in 1558, due to fresh concerns of a French attack. Around 1570, the main bastions were filled with earth, probably to allow heavier guns to be mounted on them, and Queen Elizabeth I inspected the castle in 1573. The defences along the coast were mobilised in 1588 in response to the threat posed by the Spanish Armada and were probably kept ready for action throughout the rest of Elizabeth's reign.

=== 17th century ===
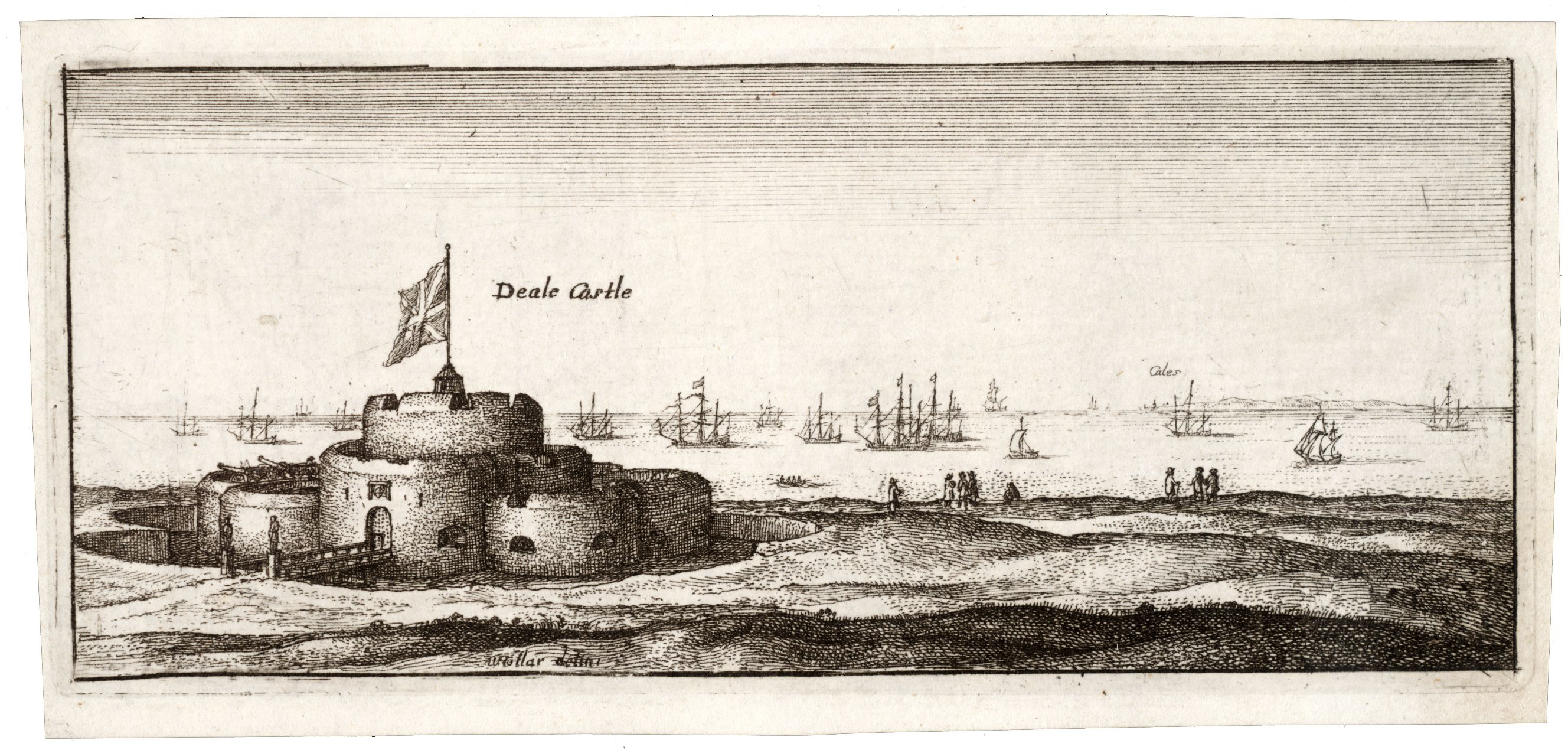
The castle, depicted by Wenceslas Hollar in the mid-17th century

During the first decade of the 1600s, England was at peace with France and Spain and coastal defences received little attention. By 1615, Deal Castle was in a poor state, its outer walls damaged by storms and coastal erosion, while a survey suggested repairs estimated at £396 were necessary. The Captain of the castle, William Byng, wrote numerous letters to his superiors, claiming winter storms had filled the moat with water and stones from the beach and undermined the castle foundations. By 1618, he reported most of the garrison were living in the nearby town, with only a small guard force manning the castle at night.

As its condition deteriorated, fighting between Dutch, French and Spanish ships in the Downs became common, increasing the strategic importance of fortifications along the Kent coast. A new survey in 1624 estimated the cost of repairs had escalated to £1,243 and George Villiers, 1st Duke of Buckingham, suggested nearby Camber Castle be demolished to provide materiel for the work. This does not appear to have been acted on, although some repairs were probably completed in the late 1630s. The castle was seized by Parliamentarian forces at the start of the First English Civil War in August 1642, with William Batten replacing William Byng, who was suspected of Royalist sympathies, although the castle played little part in this conflict.

When the Second English Civil War broke out in 1648, the Parliamentarian navy was based in the Downs, protected by Walmer and the other Henrician castles, but by May a Royalist insurrection was under way across Kent. The previous year, Batten had been forced to resign as Commander of the Fleet and he now encouraged elements of the navy to switch sides. Sir Henry Palmer, a former sailor, accompanied by other members of the Kentish gentry, also called on the fleet to revolt, taking advantage of the many fellow Kentish men in the crews. Walmer and Deal Castle declared for the King, shortly after the garrisons at Sandown. Rainsborough was removed from his post as captain. With both the coastal fortresses and the navy now under Royalist control, Parliament feared that foreign forces might be landed along the coast or aid sent to the Scots.

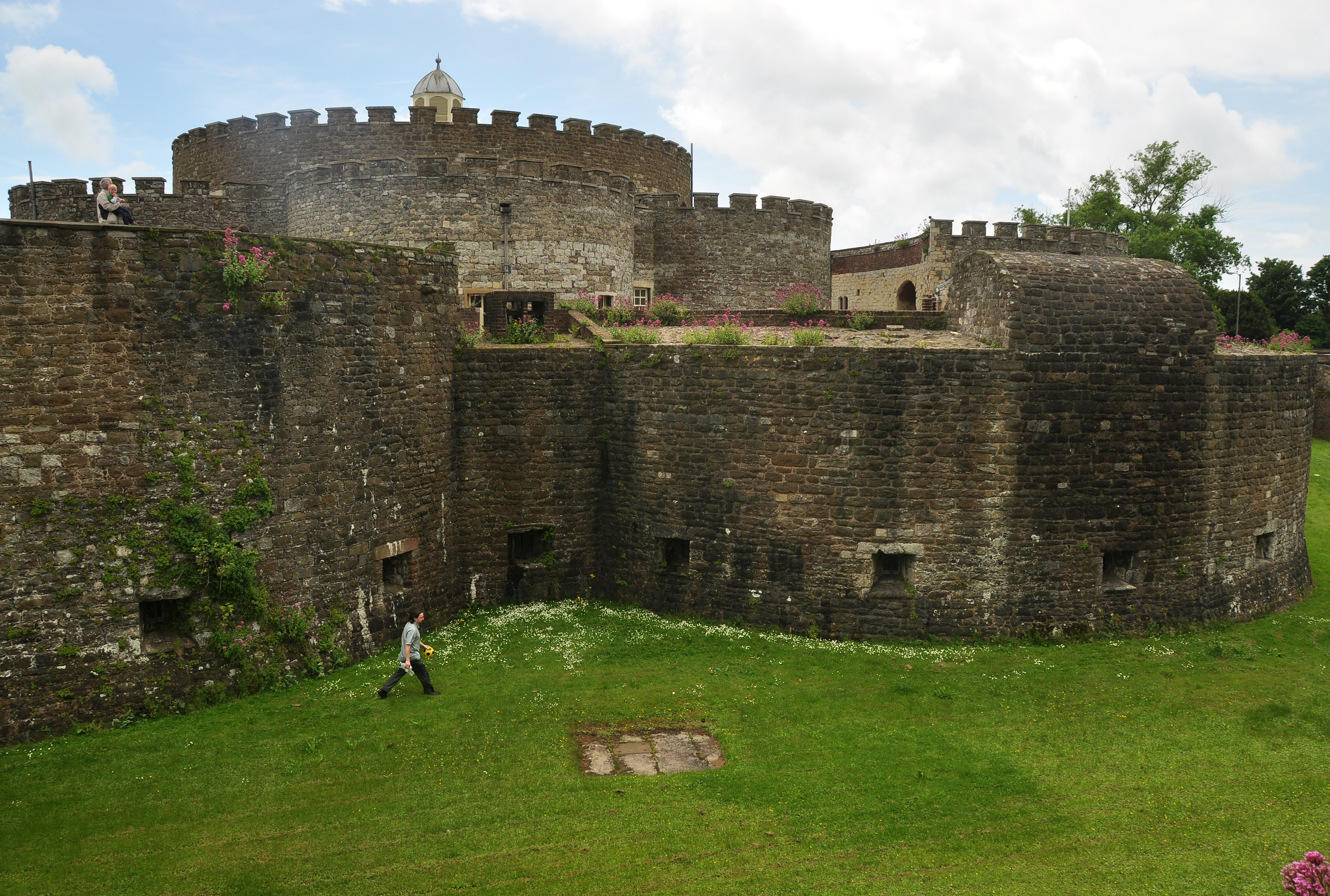
The east side of the castle, showing the moat and the sequence of gun-ports at ground level

Parliament defeated the wider insurgency at the Battle of Maidstone at the start of June and then sent a force under the command of Colonel Nathaniel Rich to deal with Deal and the other castles along the Downs. Walmer Castle was the first to be besieged and surrendered on 12 July. Deal, which had been resupplied by the Royalists from the sea, was besieged in July. A Royalist fleet bombarded the Parliamentarian positions and temporarily landed a force of 1,500 Flemish mercenaries in support of the revolt, but a shortage of money forced their return to the Continent. The garrison then carried out a surprise attack on their besiegers but were fought back with some losses. The fleet, under the command of Prince Charles, attempted to land a fresh force in August, but despite three attempts the operation failed and suffered heavy losses. After news arrived of the Royalist defeat at Preston, Deal surrendered on 20 August and artillery assaults then began on Sandown, leading the remaining garrisons to surrender.

Rich became the new Captain and reported the castle had been badly damaged during the conflict, being "much torn and spoiled with the granades", and he estimated repairs work would cost at least £500. A governor, Samuel Taverner, was appointed, supported by a corporal and twenty soldiers. In light of the Dutch threat, Deal Castle was maintained and kept equipped with powder, and was reinforced with earthworks and soldiers at the start of the First Anglo-Dutch War in 1652. Following the Stuart Restoration in 1660, the garrison was reduced in size and their pay reduced, but the castle continued to play an important role in defending the Downs during the Second and Third Anglo-Dutch Wars, supported by local trained bands. Byng attempted to reclaim his former captainship under the new regime, and may have been briefly reappointed in early 1660. Following the December 1688 Glorious Revolution which removed James II, the townsfolk of Deal seized the castle in support of William of Orange, and took steps to defend the Downs against a feared Irish invasion which never materialised.

=== 18th–21st centuries ===
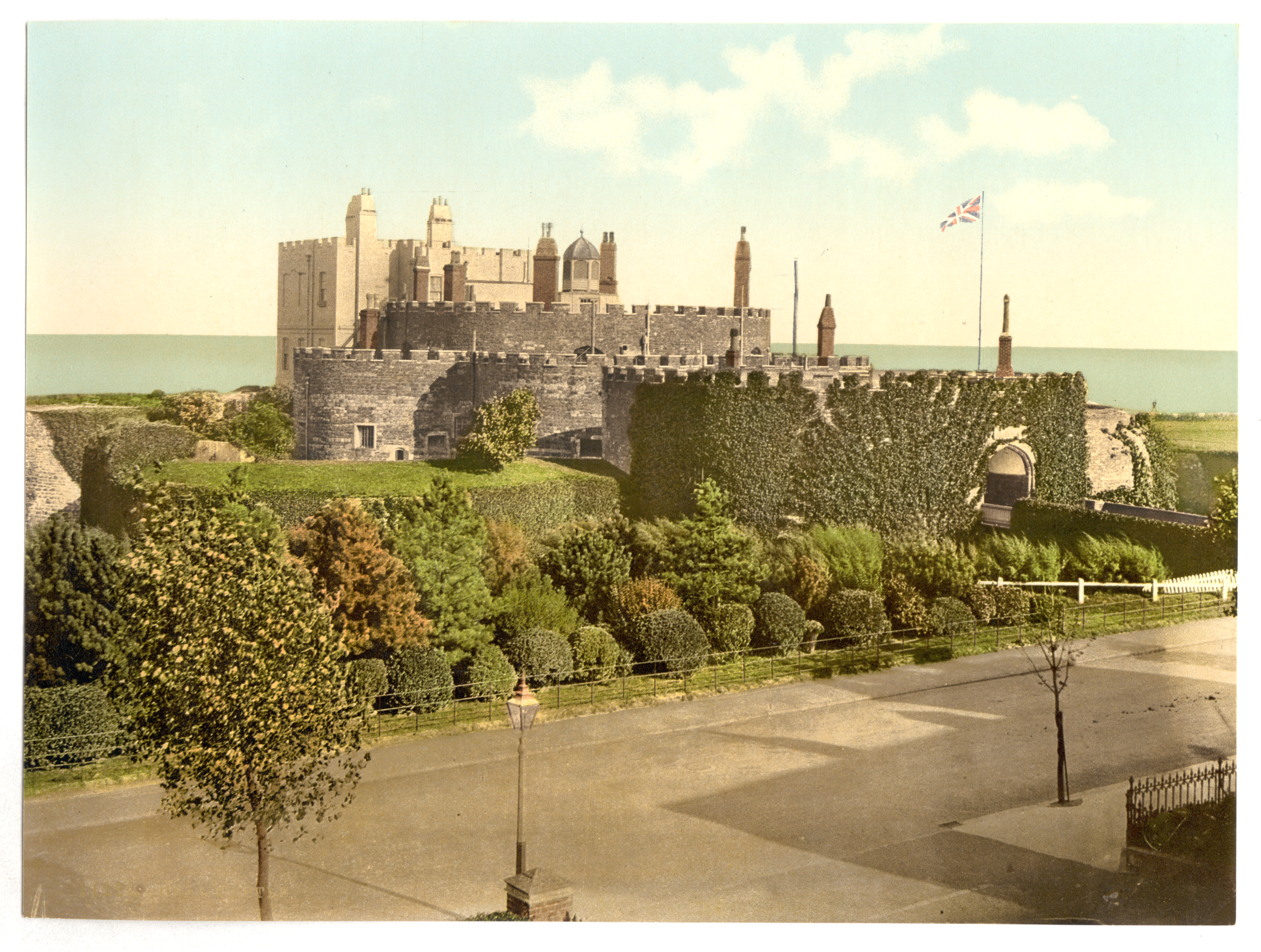
The castle at the end of the 19th century; at the rear are the captain's quarters, since destroyed

Deal Castle continued to be used as a military fortification throughout the 18th century and in 1728 it was equipped with 11 culverin guns. The following year, the captain, naval officer Sir John Norris, redeveloped the castle to improve his personal accommodation. Similar work had been carried out at Walmer in 1708 by the Duke of Dorset, Lionel Sackville and there may have been some competition between the two men. The keep was redesigned with medieval-style battlements and wood-panelled accommodation at the rear overlooking the sea; the porter's lodge was also updated.

During the Napoleonic Wars, the castle was armed with nine 36-pounder guns, supported by further artillery batteries placed along the beach. To protect Deal, units of infantry and cavalry, called fencibles, were formed in 1794 by William Pitt the Younger—then both the prime minister and the Lord Warden of the Cinque Ports—and in 1802 units of bombardiers recruited by Pitt carried out military exercises at the castle. The politician and banker Lord Carrington carried out improvements to the castle in 1802, apparently as a rival project to his friend Pitt's work at Walmer. According to Samuel Wilberforce, Carrington had hoped to charge the cost of the work to the Treasury, but when he attempted to submit the claims, they were rejected by Pitt and he had to pay for the improvements himself.

Deal Castle was increasingly resembling a private house, rather than purely a fortification, and this led to arguments in 1829 as to whether it should be subject to local taxation as a private dwelling, or continue to be exempt as a military site. The captaincy had long since become an honorary position, given out as a reward by the Crown. In 1898, the War Office agreed that the Office of Works should be consulted over any external alterations to the historic castle and that the Office of Works would be responsible for paying for any resulting work. The War Office finally concluded in 1904 that the castle no longer had any value either as a defence or as a barracks and transferred it entirely to the Office of Works. When the captain was not in residence it was opened to visitors.

During the Second World War, in November 1940, during the Blitz, German bombers destroyed much of the captain's quarters, forcing the incumbent, William Birdwood, to move to Hampton Court Palace. Two 6-inch naval guns were mounted in front of the castle between 1940 and 1944, manned by 337 Battery of 563 Coast Regiment. The castle operated as a Battery Operating Post—one of the first-floor rooms in the keep became the Battery Office—and provided accommodation. Following Birdwood's death, in 1951, the castle officially ceased to function as a residence and was passed to the Ministry of Public Building and Works. Restoration work was carried out during the 1950s, largely removing the remaining 18th-century modifications on the seaward side of the castle. In 1972 the captaincy of Deal Castle (in abeyance since 1951) was revived, as an honorary appointment, and vested in General Sir Norman Tailyour; he was succeeded in 1979 by Major General Ian Harrison. Since the latter's death, in 2008, the captaincy has been held ex officio by the Commandant General Royal Marines.

In the 21st century, Deal Castle is operated by English Heritage as a tourist attraction, receiving 25,256 visitors in 2008. It is protected under UK law as a scheduled monument.

== Architecture ==
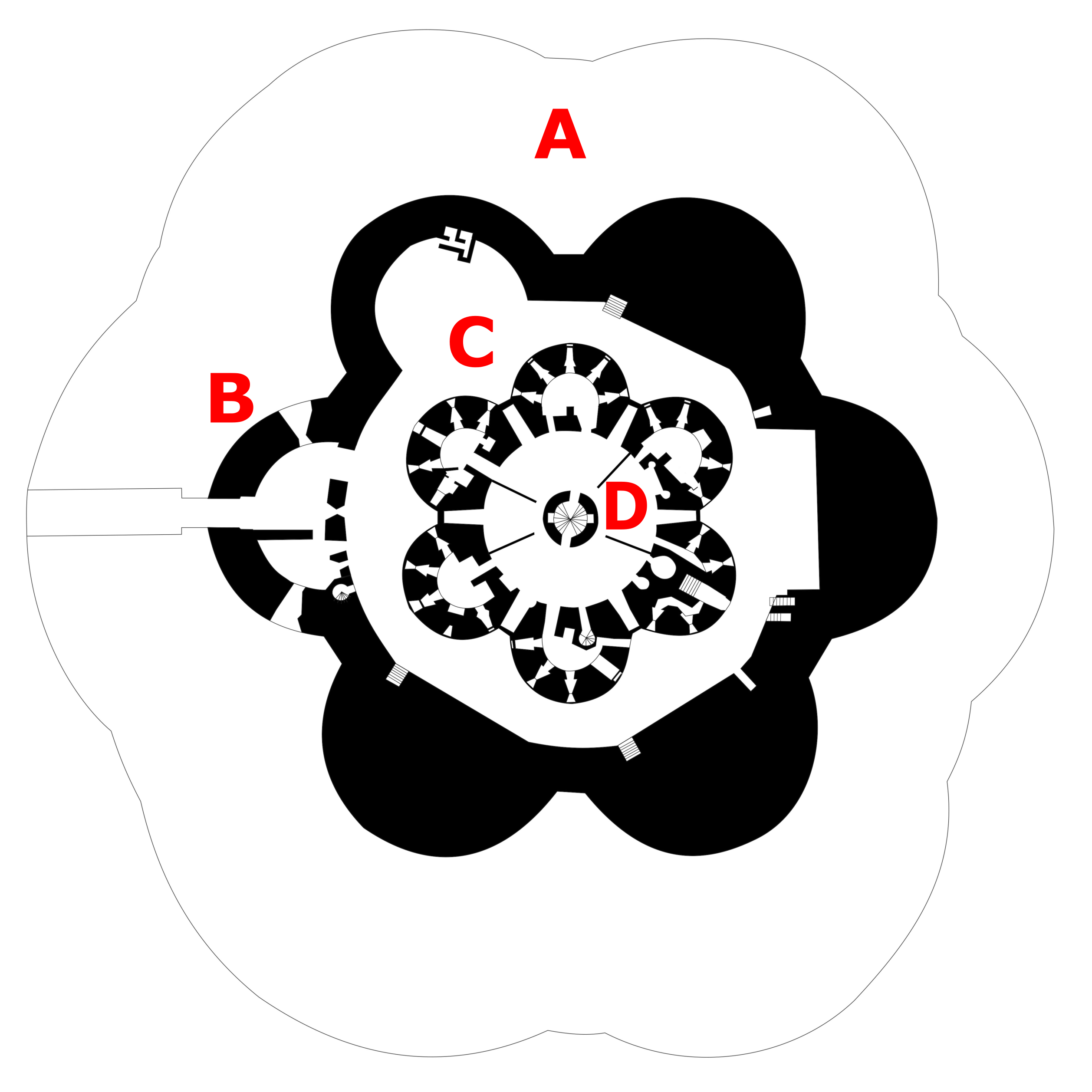
Ground floor plan: A – moat; B – gatehouse; C – inner courtyard; D – keep

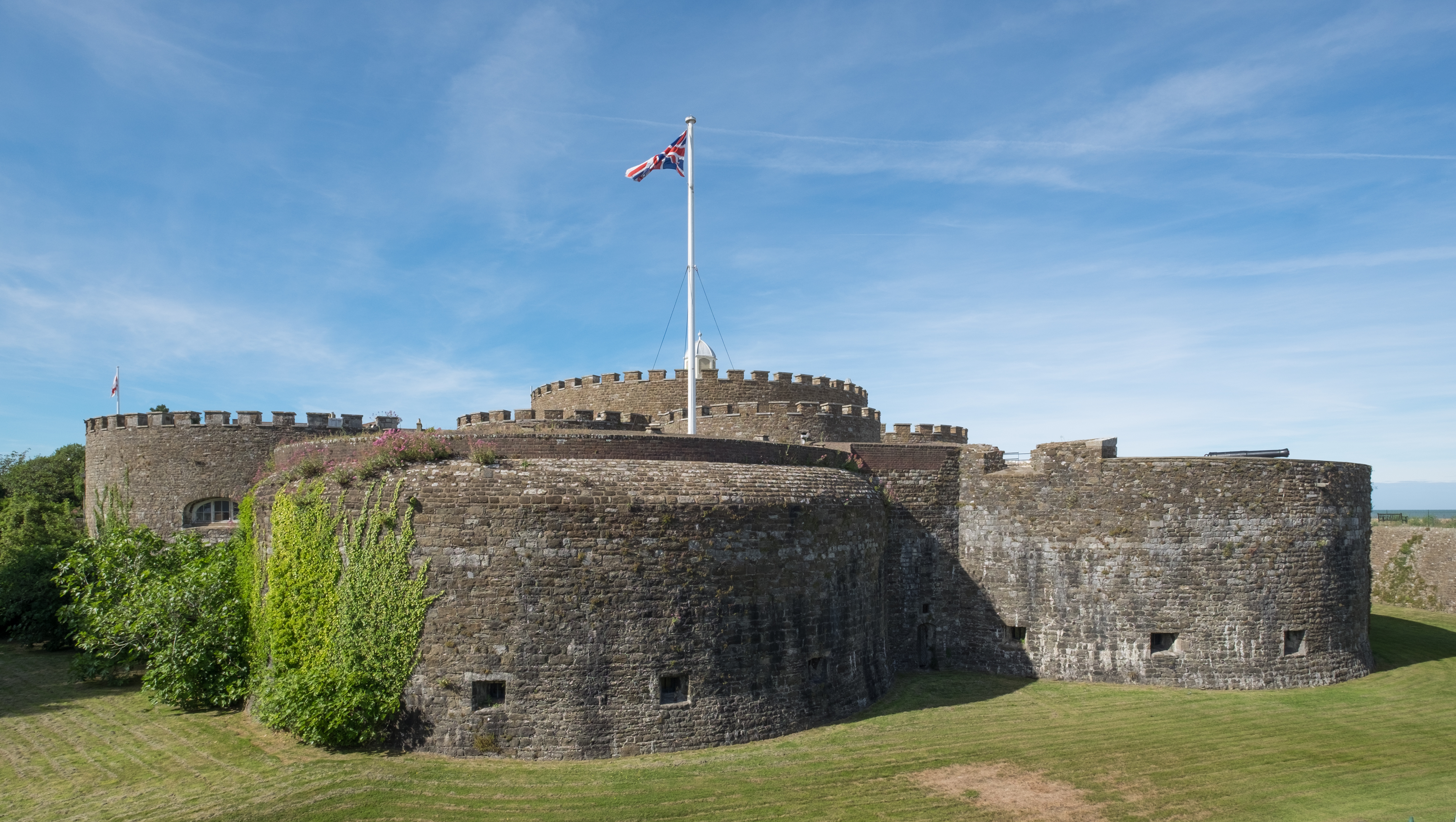
The castle from the south in 2018

Deal Castle retains most of its original 16th-century structure, including a tall keep with six semi-circular bastions, 86 feet (26 m) across, at the centre, flanked by a further six rounded bastions, the western of which served as a gatehouse, surrounded by a moat and a curtain wall. The castle's bastion walls are 15 feet (4.6 m) thick. It was constructed using Kentish ragstone from near Maidstone, locally made bricks and Caen stone recycled from local monasteries. It was larger than its sister castles at Walmer and Sandown, measuring approximately 234 by 216 feet (71 by 66 m) across and covering 0.85 acres (0.34 ha).

The castle originally had four tiers of artillery – the heaviest and longest-range weapons occupying the upper levels, including the keep – with a total of 66 firing positions and another 53 gunloops in the basement for handguns, should close defence be required. The embrasures in the walls were all widely splayed to provide the maximum possible space for the guns to operate and traverse, and the interior of the castle was designed with vents to allow the smoke from its guns to escape. The battlements on the modern castle are in a faux medieval, rather than Tudor, style and date from 1732.

The historian John Hale considered the original castle to form a transitional design between older medieval English designs and the newer Italian styles of defence. Like its sister castles along the Downs, Deal suffered from design problems: it needed too many guns to ever be fully equipped; its curved surfaces were vulnerable to attack; and despite attempts to keep the walls low and thick, its relatively high profile, driven by the requirement to support several tiers of defences, exposed it to attack.

Deal Castle is entered through the gatehouse, which originally overlooked a walled garden, since largely destroyed. The dry, stone-lined moat, 20 metres (66 ft) wide and 5 metres (16 ft) deep, would originally have been crossed over a stone causeway and a drawbridge, the latter now replaced by a modern wooden bridge. The gatehouse still has its original iron-studded doors – the historian Jonathan Coad considers them "among the best preserved for their date" – and five murder-holes to enable the garrison to defend the internal passageway with missiles or handguns; it would originally have also been protected by a portcullis at the entrance. The outer bastions were filled with earth in the 1570s, and have 18th-century ramparts; the superstructure around the eastern bastion was rebuilt after the Second World War. A passageway called "the Rounds" runs along the outside of the outer bastions, linking the handgun positions covering the base of the moat.

The keep has a central newel staircase, linking the basement, ground and first floors. When first built, the garrison would have lived on the ground floor of the keep, the first floor being used by the captain, and the basement for stores. The ground floor is subdivided by radial walls and originally would have been further subdivided by partitions; the original ovens and fireplace survive. The first floor mainly dates from the 1720s, although some Tudor elements remain. There is a wooden lantern structure on the top of the keep that contains a bell dating from 1655 and early 18th-century graffiti. The keep's gun embrasures were converted to form sash windows in the 18th and 19th centuries.

== See also ==
- List of Captains of Deal Castle

== Bibliography ==
- Ashton, Robert (1994). Counter-revolution: The Second Civil War and Its Origins, 1646–8. Avon, UK: The Bath Press. ISBN 9780300061147.
- Biddle, Martin; Hiller, Jonathon; Scott, Ian; Streeten, Anthony (2001). Henry VIII's Coastal Artillery Fort at Camber Castle, Rye, East Sussex: An Archaeological Structural and Historical Investigation. Oxford, UK: Oxbow Books. ISBN 0904220230.
- Coad, Jonathan (2000). Deal Castle, Kent. London, UK: English Heritage. ISBN 1850746974.
- Colvin, H. M.; Ransome, D. R.; Summerson (1982). The History of the King's Works, Volume 4: 1485–1660, Part 2. London, UK: HMSO. ISBN 0116708328.
- Elvin, Charles R. S. (1890). Records of Walmer, Together with "The Three Castles that Keep the Downs". London, UK: Henry Gray. OCLC 4866519.
- Elvin, Charles R. S. (1894). The History of Walmer and Walmer Castle. Canterbury, UK: Cross and Jackman. OCLC 23374336.
- Fry, Sebastian (2014). A History of the National Heritage Collection: Volume Two: 1900–1913. London, UK: English Heritage. ISSN 2046-9799.
- Harrington, Peter (2007). The Castles of Henry VIII. Oxford, UK: Osprey Publishing. ISBN 9781472803801.
- Hale, John R. (1983). Renaissance War Studies. London, UK: Hambledon Press. ISBN 0907628176.
- Kennedy, D. E. (1962). "The English Naval Revolt of 1648". The English Historical Review. 77 (303): 247–256. doi:10.1093/ehr/lxxvii.ccciii.247.
- King, D. J. Cathcart (1991). The Castle in England and Wales: An Interpretative History. London, UK: Routledge Press. ISBN 9780415003506.
- Lowry, Bernard (2006). Discovering Fortifications: From the Tudors to the Cold War. Princes Risborough, UK: Shire Publications. ISBN 9780747806516.
- Morley, B. M. (1976). Henry VIII and the Development of Coastal Defence. London, UK: Her Majesty's Stationery Office. ISBN 0116707771.
- O'Neil, B. H. St John (1985) [1966]. Deal Castle, Kent. London, UK: Historic Buildings and Monuments Commission for England. ISBN 1850740321. 1966 Edition
- Parker, Sarah E. (2005). Grace & Favour: A Handbook of Who Lived Where in Hampton Court Palace, 1750 to 1950. Surrey, UK: Historic Royal Palaces. ISBN 1873993501.
- Rutton, W. L. (1898). "Henry VIII's Castles at Sandown, Deal, Walmer, Sandgate, and Camber". Archaeologia Cantiana. 23: 24–30.
- Saunders, A. D. (1963). Deal & Walmer Castles Guidebook. Her Majesty's Stationery Office (HMSO). OCLC 1008177948.
- Saunders, Andrew (1989). Fortress Britain: Artillery Fortifications in the British Isles and Ireland. Liphook, UK: Beaufort. ISBN 1855120003.
- Thompson, M. W. (1987). The Decline of the Castle. Cambridge, UK: Cambridge University Press. ISBN 1854226088.
- Walton, Steven A. (2010). "State Building Through Building for the State: Foreign and Domestic Expertise in Tudor Fortification". Osiris. 25 (1): 66–84. doi:10.1086/657263.
