= Sandown Castle, Kent =

Former artillery fort in Sandown, Kent

Sandown Castle
- Sandown, Kent, England
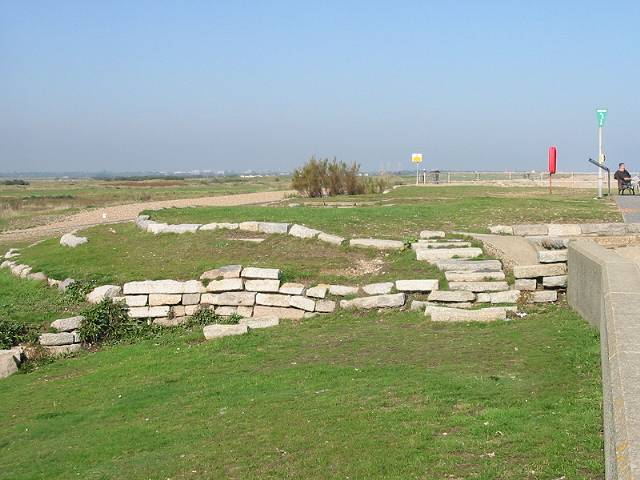

Site information
- Type: Device Fort
- Open to the public: Yes
- Condition: Limited ruins remain

Location
- Coordinates: 51°14′18″N 1°24′08″E

Site history
- Events: Second English Civil War

Scheduled monument
- Official name: Sandown Castle
- Designated: 30 August 1960
- Reference no.: 1005147

Sandown Castle was an artillery fort constructed by Henry VIII in Sandown, Kent, between 1539 and 1540. It formed part of the King's Device programme to protect against invasion from France and the Holy Roman Empire, and defended the strategically important Downs anchorage off the English coast.

Comprising a keep and four circular bastions, the moated stone castle covered 0.59 acres (0.24 ha) and had 39 firing positions on the upper levels for artillery, with 31 gunloops in the basement for handguns. It cost the Crown a total of £27,092 to build the three castles of Sandown, Walmer and Deal, which lay adjacent to one another along the coast and were connected by earthwork defences. (Note: Comparing early modern costs and prices with those of the modern period is challenging. £27,092 in 1539 could be equivalent to between £15.3 million and £6,960 million in 2014, depending on the price comparison used, and £174 to between £98,000 to £44 million. For comparison, the total royal expenditure on all the Device Forts across England between 1539–47 came to £376,500, with St Mawes, for example, costing £5,018, and Sandgate £5,584.) The original invasion threat passed, but during the Second English Civil War of 1648–49, Sandown was seized by pro-Royalist insurgents and was only retaken by Parliamentary forces after several months' fighting.

By the 19th century, the castle was suffering badly from the effects of coastal erosion but remained in military use until 1863. The War Office then demolished the upper levels with explosives, carrying out a second wave of demolition work in 1882 and destroying most of the surviving stonework in 1893. The remains of Sandown were purchased by the town of Deal for £35 to form part of the local sea defences. (Note: Comparing 19th century costs and prices with those of the modern period depends on the price comparison used. £563 in 1863 could be worth between £57,000 and £1.2 million in 2014 terms, depending on the measure used, and £35 in 1894 to between £3,700 and £42,000.) The remaining masonry was encased in concrete in the late 1980s to form a sea wall but remains vulnerable to further erosion by the sea.

== History ==
=== 16th century ===
Sandown Castle was built as a consequence of international tensions between England, France and the Holy Roman Empire in the final years of the reign of King Henry VIII. Traditionally the Crown had left coastal defences to the local lords and communities, only taking a modest role in building and maintaining fortifications, and while France and the Empire remained in conflict with one another, maritime raids were common but an actual invasion of England seemed unlikely. Modest defences, based around simple blockhouses and towers, existed in the south-west and along the Sussex coast, with a few more impressive works in the north of England, but in general the fortifications were very limited in scale.

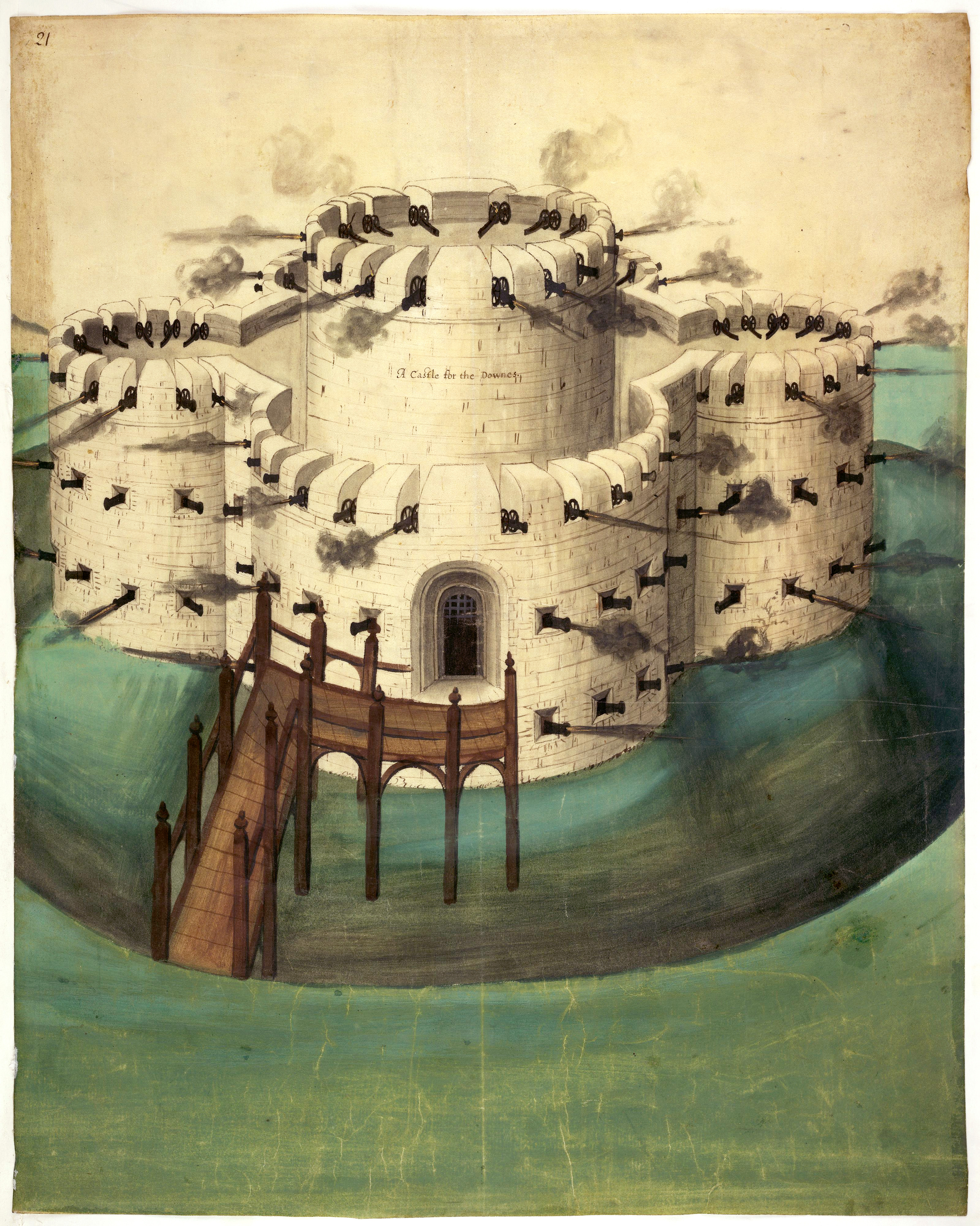
A 1539 early design for either Sandown or nearby Walmer Castle

In 1533, Henry broke with Pope Paul III to annul the long-standing marriage to his wife, Catherine of Aragon, and remarry. Catherine was the aunt of Charles V, the Holy Roman Emperor, and Charles took the annulment as a personal insult. This resulted in France and the Empire declaring an alliance against Henry in 1538, and the Pope encouraging the two countries to attack England. An invasion of England appeared certain. In response, Henry issued an order, called a "device", in 1539, giving instructions for the "defence of the realm in time of invasion" and the construction of forts along the English coastline.

Sandown and the adjacent castles of Deal and Walmer were constructed to protect the Downs in east Kent, an important anchorage formed by the Goodwin Sands that gave access to Deal Beach, on which enemy soldiers could easily be landed. The stone castles were supported by a line of four earthwork forts, known as the Great Turf, the Little Turf Bulwark, the Great White Bulwark of Clay and the Walmer Bulwark, and a 2.5 miles (4.0 km) long defensive ditch and bank. Collectively the castles became known as the "castles of the Downs" and cost the Crown a total of £27,092.

The castle was built between April 1539 and the autumn of 1540, by a team including Richard Benese as the surveyor, William Clement as the master carpenter, and Christopher Dickenson as the master mason. It was nearly identical to its sister castle at Walmer, with a tall keep, 83 feet (25 m) across, at the centre, and flanked by four rounded bastions, also called lunettes, and a moat, which was surrounded in turn by a curtain wall. Its curved walls were 15 feet (4.6 m) thick. In total it was approximately 165 by 165 feet (50 by 50 m) across, covering 0.59 acres (0.24 ha). The historian John Hale considered the castle to form a transitional design between older medieval English designs and newer Italian styles of defence.

Sandown had three tiers of artillery – the heaviest and longest range weapons occupying the upper levels – with a total of 39 firing positions, and 31 gunloops in the basement for handguns should close defence be required. The embrasures in the walls were all widely splayed to provide the maximum possible space for the guns to operate and traverse, and the interior of the castle was designed with vents to allow the smoke from its guns to escape. It was initially garrisoned by a captain, two lieutenants, two porters, ten gunners and three soldiers, at an annual cost of £174 a year.

=== 17th century ===
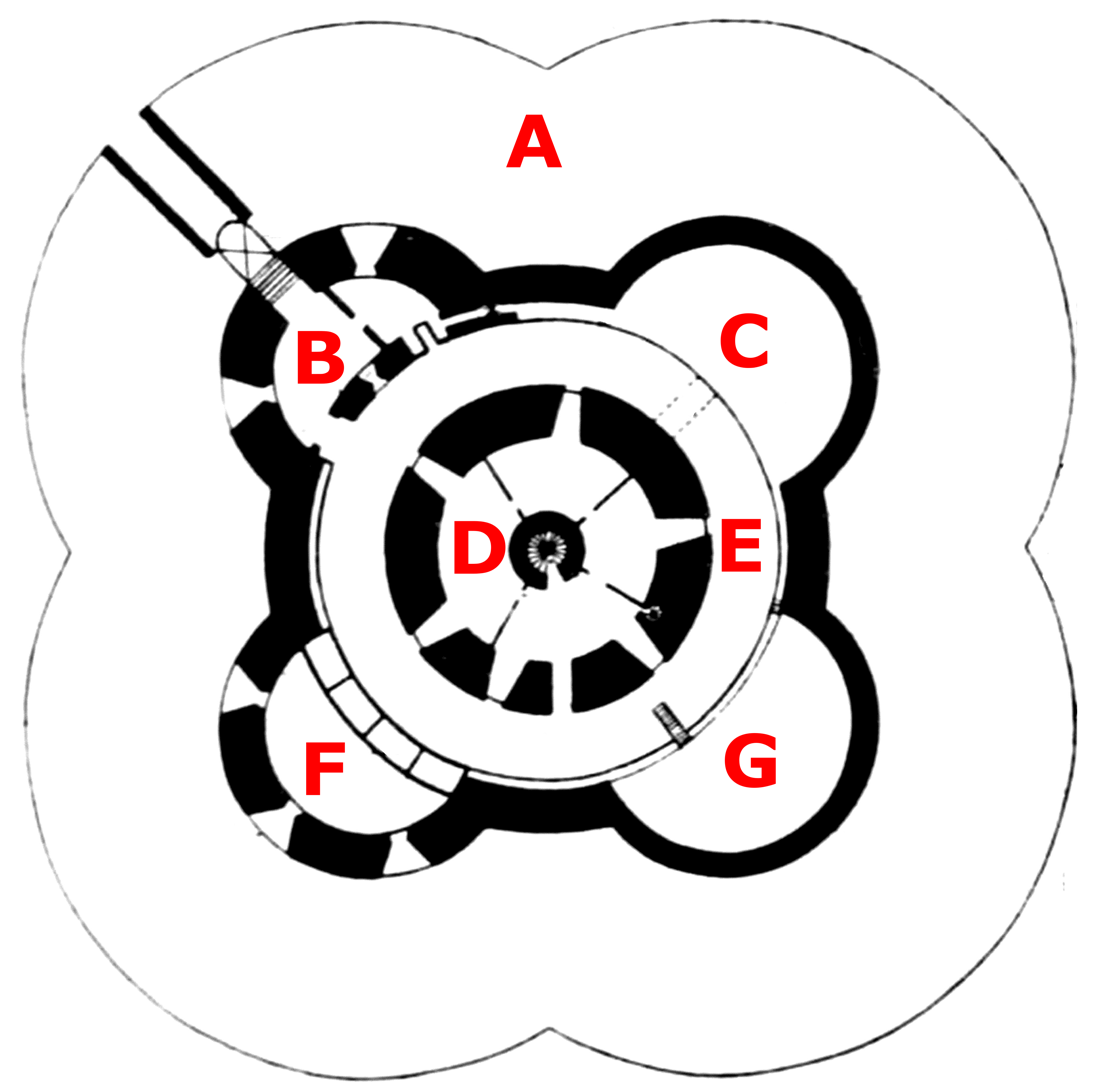
Ground floor plan: A – moat; B – gatehouse and porter's lodge; C – battery of seven guns; D – keep; E – inner passageway; F – gunroom and gunners' cabins; G – battery of five guns

Although the original invasion threat passed, Sandown continued in military use into the 17th century. A 1616 survey nonetheless reported that a range of repairs were needed, at an estimated total cost of £437, while a 1634 survey noted that work estimated at £1,243 was required. In contrast, an inspection in 1635 showed the castle to be in reasonable structural condition, but antiquated in design. A report produced in 1641 suggested that £8,000 of investment was required in the three castles of the Downs, including £3,000 for additional sea defences. (Note: Comparing early modern costs and prices with those of the modern period is challenging. £43 in 1616 could be equivalent to between £73,000 and £23 million in 2014, depending on the price comparison used; £1,243 in 1634 to between £179,000 and £51 million, and £8,000 in 1641 to between £1.2 million and £351 million.)

Sandown Castle did not play a prominent role during the first English Civil War that broke out between the supporters of King Charles I and Parliament; it was taken by Parliamentary forces at the start of the conflict in 1642. Following the few years of unsteady peace after 1645, the Second Civil War broke out in 1648, this time with Charles' Royalist supporters joined by Scottish allies. The Parliamentary navy was based in the Downs, protected by Sandown and the other Henrician castles, but by May a Royalist insurrection was underway across Kent.

Vice-Admiral William Batten had been forced by Parliamentary officials to resign from his post as Commander of the Fleet the previous year, and he now encouraged the fleet to join the Royalist faction. Sir Henry Palmer, a former sailor, accompanied by other members of the Kentish gentry, also called on the fleet to revolt, taking advantage of the many fellow Kentish men in the crews. Sandown Castle declared for the King, followed shortly afterwards by the garrisons at Deal and Walmer as well. With both the coastal fortresses and the navy now under Royalist control, Parliament feared that foreign forces might be landed along the coast or aid sent to the Scots.

Parliament defeated the wider insurgency at the Battle of Maidstone at the start of June, and then sent a force under the command of Colonel Nathaniel Rich to deal with Sandown and the other castles along the Downs. Walmer Castle was the first to be besieged and surrendered on 12 July. An earthwork fort was then built between Sandown and Deal, which may have been defended by around 150 men each. Deal was attacked in late July, and in August artillery assaults began on Sandown as well. The Royalists mounted an attack from the fleet on 10 August, with a second attack following on 15 August, involving a landing of 750 men supported by 50 soldiers from Sandown. Neither operation was successful and Sandown finally surrendered on 5 September, a few weeks after the surrender of Deal.

In 1649, Parliament ordered that supplies of ammunition and powder be sent to Sandown and the other castles of the Downs. Fresh earthworks were erected during the Interregnum between Sandown and Deal to address with the threat of Dutch attack. The garrison at Sandown remained substantial during the period, with a governor and 21 soldiers, but when Charles II was restored to the throne in 1660 he reduced the numbers again to a captain and 18 men. In the Glorious Revolution of 1688 against Charles' brother, King James II, the townsfolk of Deal seized Sandown Castle on behalf of William III, the Prince of Orange.

The former Parliamentarian, Colonel John Hutchinson, was infamously detained by the Crown at Sandown in 1664; his wife, Lucy, who subsequently widely publicised his case, described the castle as ruinous and his imprisonment there as inhumane. After several months Hutchinson died in the castle, his doctor blaming his physical decline on the conditions in which he had been kept.

=== 18th–21st centuries ===
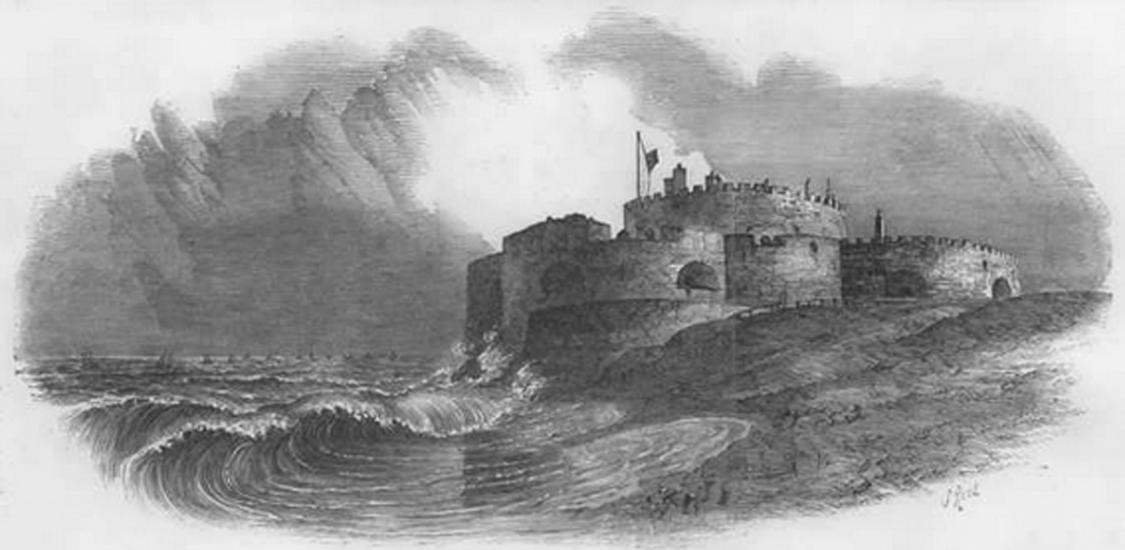
Engraving of the castle in 1853

In 1785, the sea broke through the outer walls of the castle, and coastal erosion continued over the next few years. The castle was initially described as being "barely habitable", but by 1793 it was considered "unfit for habitation." It was repaired and garrisoned again during the French Revolutionary Wars, with two new artillery batteries being constructed to the north of the castle. Early in the 19th century the castle was used as by the early coastguard for the suppression of local smuggling.

Coastal erosion continued during the 19th century. As a consequence, the War Office sold off the reusable materials of the fortification for £564 in 1863 and demolished the upper parts of the castle, leaving a level platform across the lower parts of the keep and the bastions. Part of the stone was purchased by the Earl of Granville and used in his building work at Walmer Castle, while other masonry was reused in the construction of Deal Pier. The sea continued to erode the remaining stonework and destroyed one of the adjacent artillery batteries – the other was converted for use by the coastguard. In 1882 the Royal Engineers used explosives to remove around 600 tonnes (590 long tons; 660 short tons) of masonry from the castle for use in the construction of an officer's house at Dover Castle, causing further damage.

In 1883 architectural historian Hayter Lewis complained to the British Archaeological Association that more needed to be done to protect the ruins, contrasting their poor treatment with that of the other castles along the coast. Despite this, concerns continued to be raised about the safety of the ruins facing along the sea, and in 1894 the Royal Engineers blew up the bastions and the keep on the seaward side using guncotton. The town of Deal then bought the remains from the government for £35 for use as part of their local sea defences. Coastal erosion continued and between 1988 and 1989 the remains were encased in concrete to form a sea wall, although they remain vulnerable to further coastal erosion. The remains of the castle are protected under UK law as a scheduled monument.

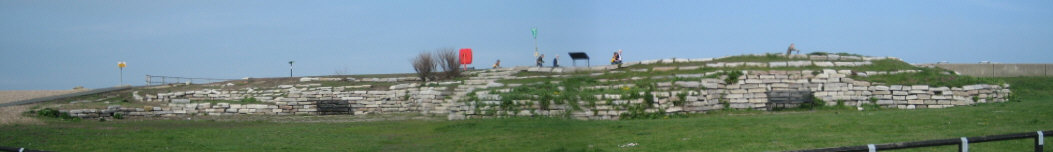
Panorama of the remains in 2006

== Bibliography ==
- Anonymous (1883). The Annual Register: A Review of Public Events at Home and Abroad, for the Year 1882, Part II. London, UK: Rivingtons. OCLC 874176803.
- Ashton, Robert (1994). Counter-revolution: The Second Civil War and Its Origins, 1646–8. Avon, UK: The Bath Press. ISBN 9780300061147.
- Biddle, Martin; Hiller, Jonathon; Scott, Ian; Streeten, Anthony (2001). Henry VIII's Coastal Artillery Fort at Camber Castle, Rye, East Sussex: An Archaeological Structural and Historical Investigation. Oxford, UK: Oxbow Books. ISBN 0904220230.
- Bull, Stephen (2008). 'The Furie of the Ordnance': Artillery in the English Civil Wars. Woodbridge, UK: Boydell Press. ISBN 9781843834038.
- Elvin, Charles R. S. (1890). Records of Walmer, Together with "The Three Castles that Keep the Downs". London, UK: Henry Gray. OCLC 4866519.
- Elvin, Charles R. S. (1894). The History of Walmer and Walmer Castle. Canterbury, UK: Cross and Jackman. OCLC 23374336.
- Hale, John R. (1983). Renaissance War Studies. London, UK: Hambledon Press. ISBN 0907628176.
- Harrington, Peter (2007). The Castles of Henry VIII. Oxford, UK: Osprey Publishing. ISBN 9781472803801.
- Kennedy, D. E. (1962). "The English Naval Revolt of 1648". The English Historical Review. 77 (303): 247–256. doi:10.1093/ehr/lxxvii.ccciii.247.
- King, D. J. Cathcart (1991). The Castle in England and Wales: An Interpretative History. London, UK: Routledge Press. ISBN 9780415003506.
- Lewis, T. Hayter (1884). "The Castles of Sandown and Sandgate". Journal of the British Archaeological Association. 40 (2): 173–178. doi:10.1080/00681288.1884.11887698.
- Mackenzie, James D. (1896). The Castles of England: Their Story and Structure, Volume II. New York, US: Macmillan. OCLC 504892038.
- Morley, B. M. (1976). Henry VIII and the Development of Coastal Defence. London, UK: Her Majesty's Stationery Office. ISBN 0116707771.
- Rutton, W. L. (1898). "Henry VIII's Castles at Sandown, Deal, Walmer, Sandgate, and Camber". Archaeologia Cantiana. 23. Kent Archaeological Society: 24–30.
- Saunders, Andrew (1989). Fortress Britain: Artillery Fortifications in the British Isles and Ireland. Liphook, UK: Beaufort. ISBN 1855120003.
- Thompson, M. W. (1987). The Decline of the Castle. Cambridge, UK: Cambridge University Press. ISBN 1854226088.
- Walton, Steven A. (2010). "State Building Through Building for the State: Foreign and Domestic Expertise in Tudor Fortification". Osiris. 25 (1): 66–84. doi:10.1086/657263. S2CID 144384757.
