= List of medieval and early modern gunpowder artillery =

A wide variety of gunpowder artillery weapons were created in the medieval and early modern period.

== List ==
| Name | Image | Notes |
|---|---|---|
| Base | | A long, narrow 15th–16th century cannon |
| Bombard | | First recorded use in 1326, made of brass. |
| Culverin | | A long-range cannon, first mentioned in 1410 |
| Curtall cannon | | A type of cannon with a short barrel. |
| Demi-culverin | | A medium cannon, smaller than a culverin |
| Drake | | A 3-pounder cannon; alternatively, an adjective to describe a lighter variant of another cannon. |
| Falconet | | A light cannon |
| Minion | | A small cannon used in the 16th and 17th centuries |
| Portpiece | | A large naval cannon |
| Saker | | A medium cannon firing a 5 to 8 lb shot |
| Serpentine | | A cannon similar to a culverin |
| Sling | | A long, narrow 17th century cannon |

== General and cited references ==
- Henry, Chris (2005). English Civil War Artillery 1642-51. Oxford: Osprey.
- Kinard, Jeff. Artillery: An Illustrated History of Its Impact.
- Needham, Joseph. Science and Civilisation in China: Military Technology: The Gunpowder Epic.
