= William Knell =

William Knell may refer to:

- William Knell (actor) (died 1587), Elizabethan English actor
- William Adolphus Knell (1801–1875), British maritime painter
- William Calcott Knell (1830–1880), British landscape painter
