= Knell =

Knell is a surname, and may refer to:

- Eric Knell (1903–1987), English Anglican Bishop
- Gary Knell (born 1954), American broadcast executive
- Phil Knell (1865–1944), American baseball player
- Wiebke Knell (born 1981), German politician
- William Knell (actor) (d 1587), Elizabethan English actor
- William Adolphus Knell (1801–1875), British maritime painter
- William Calcott Knell (1830–1880), British landscape painter

A knell is also the sound of a bell when being rung for a funeral:

- Death knell
