= Camber Castle =

16th-century English fort

- East Sussex, England
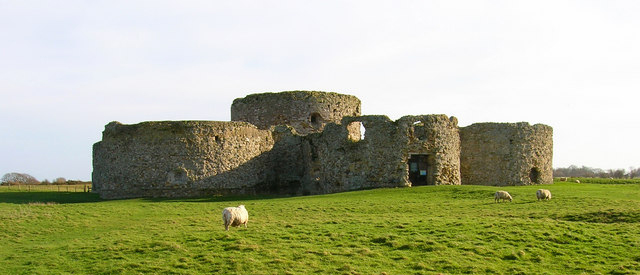
- Camber Castle, seen from the north-west

Site information
- Type: Device Fort
- Owner: English Heritage
- Open to the public: Yes

Listed Building – Grade I
- Official name: Camber Castle
- Designated: 3 August 1961
- Reference no.: 1234738
- Condition: Ruined

Location
- Shown within East Sussex
- Coordinates: 50°55′59″N 0°43′57″E
- Height: 18 metres (59 ft)

Site history
- Materials: Yellow and grey sandstone, brick

Camber Castle, also known formerly as Winchelsea Castle, is a 16th-century Device Fort, built near Rye by King Henry VIII to protect the Sussex coast of England against French attack. The first fortification on the site was a small, round artillery tower, constructed by Henry between 1512 and 1514, overlooking the Camber anchorage and the entrance to Rye Harbour.

In 1539, increasing tensions with France encouraged Henry to rethink his coastal defence plans, and Camber Castle was rebuilt and extended over the next year under the direction of the Moravian engineer, Stefan von Haschenperg. The results were considered unsatisfactory and further work was carried out from 1542 to 1543, at great expense, to rectify the problems. The result was a large, concentric artillery fort, with a central keep, surrounded by four circular bastions and a circular entrance bastion, built from stone and brick.

The finished castle was initially equipped with 28 brass and iron artillery guns and a garrison of 28 men, commanded by a captain. It may have seen service in 1545 when a French fleet attacked the coast, but its operational value was short lived. The Camber and the surrounding harbours began to silt up, becoming unusable by shipping, and the coastline receded away from the fort, eventually placing it well inland. Furthermore, the fort had been superseded by newer European military designs even before it had been completed, and peace with France later in the century removed much of the requirement for the fort. The castle still remained operational up until 1637, when it was closed by King Charles I. With the outbreak of civil war in 1642, much of the fortification was dismantled by Parliamentary forces to prevent it being used by the Royalists.

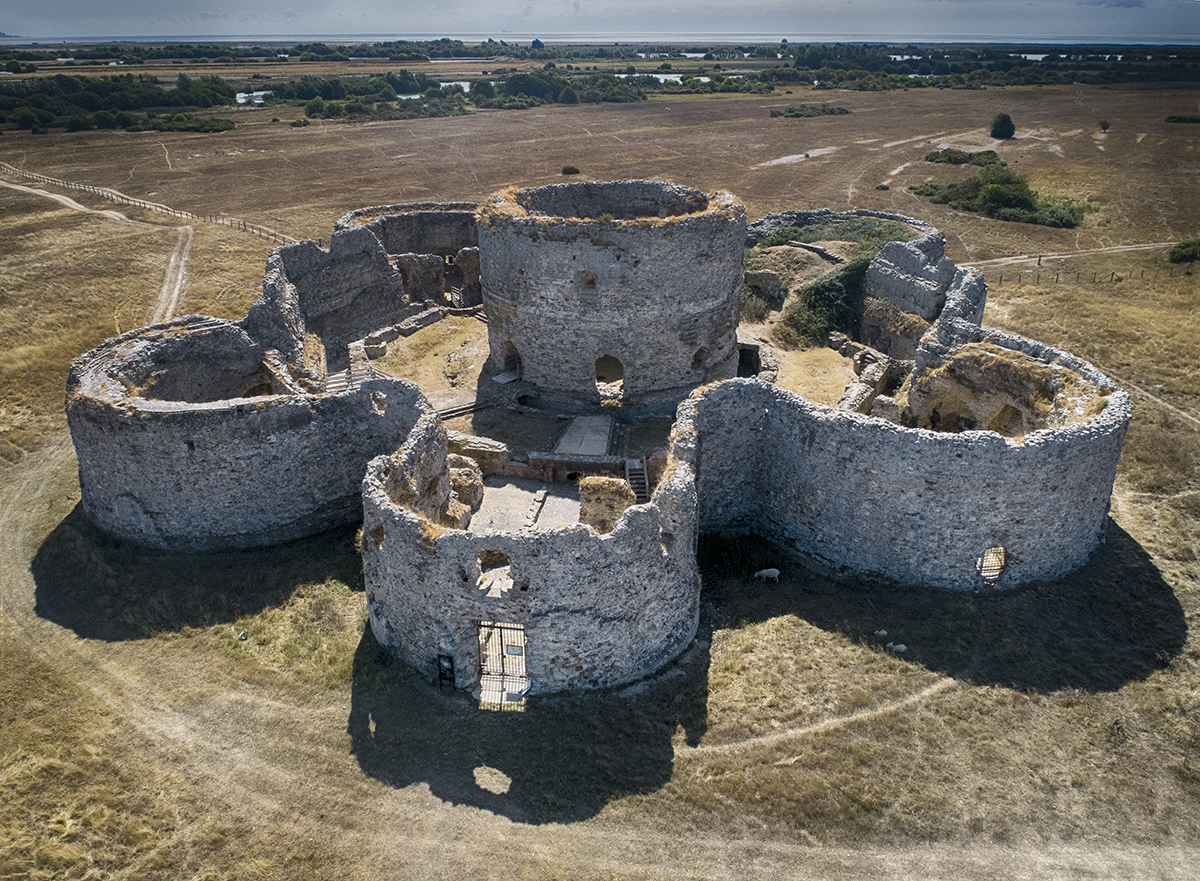
Camber Castle in the dry landscape of the 2018 summer.

The ruins became a popular spot for picnics in the 18th and 19th centuries, and was painted by J. M. W. Turner. Plans to redevelop the castle as a Martello tower or as a clubhouse for a local golf course came to nothing, although the property was used in the Second World War, probably as an early warning site.

Archaeological interest in the fort increased after the war and in 1967 it was taken into the guardianship of the state, the property being bought from the private owners in 1977. It is now operated by English Heritage, who reopened it to visitors after an extensive programme of conservation between 1968 and 1994. The fort is an unusual example of an unmodified Device Fort and is protected under UK law as a Grade I listed building.

== History ==
=== 16th – 17th centuries ===
==== Initial tower, 1512–14 ====
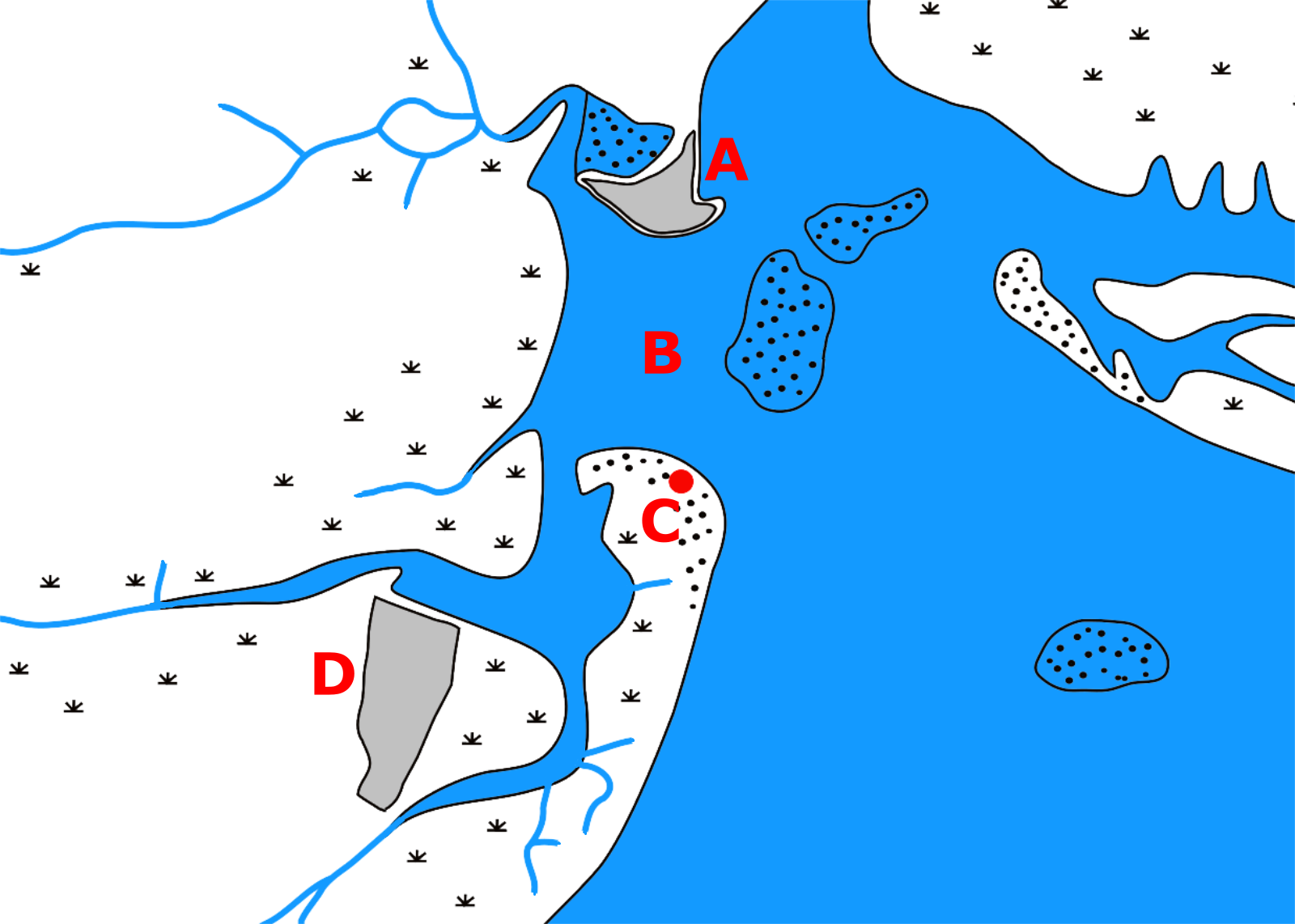
The Camber in the late medieval period. Key: A – Rye; B – the Camber anchorage: C – Camber Castle on Kevill Point; D – Winchelsea; dotted areas – sand dunes and banks

Camber Castle was built approximately 1.5 kilometres (0.93 mi) between the ports of Rye and Winchelsea on the south coast of England, overlooking a body of water called the Camber, at the mouth of the Brede, Rother and Tillingham rivers. The two towns were part of the Cinque Ports, a strategic chain of maritime towns responsible for providing ships to the king's navy, although Winchelsea's harbour had silted up by the 16th century, limiting its utility, and similar problems were beginning to impact the port of Rye. The mouth of the Camber had also begun to silt up in the late medieval period, although in this case the process had created an important new anchorage for ships.

The first fortification at Camber may have been built shortly after 1486 by Sir Richard Guldeford, the Master of the Ordnance, who was given the manor of Higham by King Henry VII in exchange for Richard constructing a tower to protect the anchorage. There is no surviving evidence, however, to show if a tower was in fact built as Guldeford had promised, and Henry VII did not invest much in his coastal defences during the rest of his reign. Many castles across England were left in poor repair, often considered to be outdated and too expensive to maintain.

Henry VIII became king in 1509 and began to follow a more aggressive policy towards neighbouring France than his father. Tensions increased and in 1512 Henry ordered the construction of an artillery tower and a new bridge at Camber. The work was carried out by Edward Guldeford, Richard's son, and cost £1,309 over the next two years. (Note: Comparing 16th century costs and prices with those of the modern period is challenging. £1,309 in 1512 could be equivalent to between £863,000 and £355 million in 2013 prices, depending on the price comparison used, £5,660 in 1539 to between £3.33 million and £1,080 million, and £10,000 in 1542 to between £5.27 million and £1,730 million. The £171 repairs in 1584 could equate to between £44,400 and £11.9 million. For comparison, the total royal expenditure on all the Device Forts across England between 1539–47 came to £376,500, with St Mawes, for example, costing £5,018, and Sandgate £5,584.) The resulting circular stone tower was 64 feet (20 m) across and around 30 feet (9.1 m) high, occupying the shingle spit of Kevill Point and controlling the Camber and the port of Rye. It would have provided relatively limited facilities and living accommodation, and was probably not permanently garrisoned.

Despite being an artillery tower with a flat roof to carry heavy guns, the tower was not initially supplied with any artillery and was therefore unable to protect Rye against the hostile naval expeditions which attacked the coast in the 1520s. After many letters from Guldeford to the Lord Chancellor, Cardinal Thomas Wolsey, some guns finally arrived around 1536 in the form of wrought iron serpentines. Prescient concerns began to be raised in the mid-1530s about whether the Camber might silt up further and ultimately become unusable as an anchorage.

==== Concentric design, 1539–40 ====
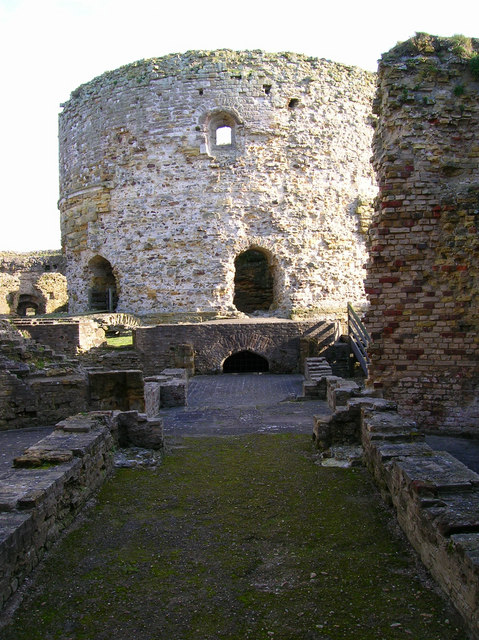
The keep, based on the original artillery tower

In 1539 the threat of invasion from France and Spain grew and Henry issued orders for his coastal defences to be improved, creating a sequence of fortifications called the Device Forts across England. These were intended to carry artillery pieces able to engage enemy naval vessels should they approach the coast, and to deter any enemy landings. As part of this programme of work, Camber Castle was considerably expanded at a cost of £5,660.

The first phase of this work took place from 1539 until autumn 1540. The Moravian engineer Stefan von Haschenperg was responsible for the design of the fort, being paid the substantial salary of £75 a year for his work on this and other similar projects, including Calshot, Hurst, Sandgate and Sandown. Philip Chute, John Fletcher and William Oxenbridge, all prominent local men, served as the commissioners for the project, Oxenbridge becoming the pay master. Finding sufficient numbers of workmen was difficult and some had to be pressed into service unwillingly. More artillery pieces were sent to the castle ahead of the work being completed, and were probably installed in temporary battery positions around the castle site.

Initially the old tower was converted into a stronger keep which was able to support artillery guns on its roof, a gatehouse was built alongside it, four stirrup towers – so-called because of their shape – a curtain wall was constructed around the outside of the castle, and bastions erected around the wall. Towards the end of this phase of work the castle was altered in a frantic burst of work, possibly driven on by pressure from the King himself. The height of the curtain wall was increased, the gatehouse extended into an entrance bastion, a new network of underground passages installed, and foreworks added around the outside of the bastions. By the end of 1540 the castle was garrisoned with 17 men and equipped with artillery, with Chute appointed as its captain.

The result was a concentric fortress, which von Haschenperg had hoped would combine the best of Italian military architecture, able to carry heavy guns but with a low profile to protect against any incoming artillery fire. Various flaws rapidly became apparent. The castle's design had focused on defence, with the result that the guns could not easily be brought to bear on enemy vessels, which had been the original intent of building the fortification by the Camber; some of the angles of fire from the defences were blocked by the entrance and the high water table may have caused serious damp problems on the ground floor. Furthermore, the design was different from the other Device Forts constructed across the region and would have stood out as unusual and not in keeping with the King's general intent for the chain of forts.

==== Redeveloped concentric design, 1542–43 ====
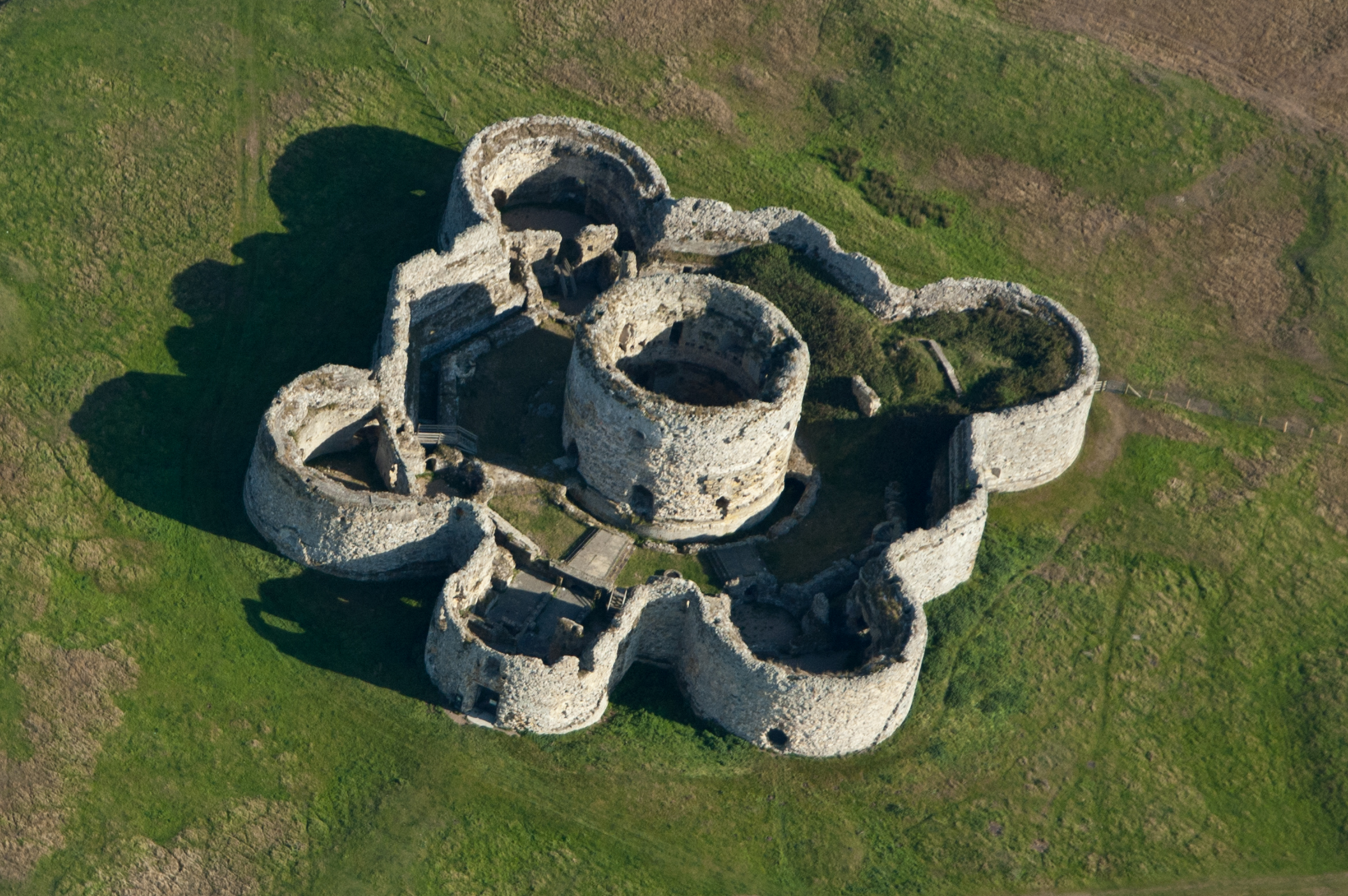
The castle's concentric design seen from the air

As a result of the problems with the original design, in summer 1542 work recommenced on the castle, well after the initial invasion scare was over, lasting until August 1543. The decision to rectify the problems with the castle may have been taken by King Henry himself. Oxenbridge appears to have stayed on as the pay master and acted as the master of the works, with von Haschenperg remaining in his role as engineer almost until the end of the project, despite the difficulties with his earlier work. The cost of the second phase of work was much higher than the first, around £10,000.

The design was rather different to von Haschenperg's first castle. The keep and the stirrup towers were raised in height, the level of the floors elevated, the curtain wall was strengthened, the old bastions entirely removed and four new, larger bastions added in their place, while the older foreworks around the castle were demolished. The keep's flat roof was altered to a pitched design, and the guns that it had supported moved into the outlying bastions. Although the size of the castle had slightly decreased, the new design had much more domestic space available for the garrison.

In practice, even the revised design ignored the acute-angled bastions which had been introduced in Europe, the round towers creating numerous patches of dead ground around the castle into which its guns could not fire; the high walls presented a greater target, the internal design was complicated and it remained difficult to move around inside the fort. Indeed, the historian Peter Harrington describes the final design as even "more archaic than its predecessor". Chute's role was extended to become the Keeper and Captain of Camber, and the Keeper of the Waters of Camber and Puddle in January 1544, for which he was paid two shillings a day. Haschenperg left England in disgrace in 1544, facing complaints that he was "a man who will pretend more knowledge than he hath indeed".

The bulk of the stone for the two phases of the project was acquired by demolishing monastic buildings in Winchelsea, and by purchasing it from the nearby Fairlight and Hastings quarries. Higher quality stone was bought from Mersham in Hampshire, and from various suppliers in Normandy. Timber was acquired from Udimore, Appledore and Knell, the latter two lumber-felling operations being run directly by the Camber project team. Chalk was brought from Dover to manufacture lime, and at least 16,000 bricks initially purchased to make the necessary kilns, with possibly over 500,000 further bricks being manufactured locally as the work progressed. Steel, iron and tiles were bought locally in Sussex, along with a 10 metric tons (9.8 long tons; 11 short tons) crane for the project's quay.

==== Operational use ====
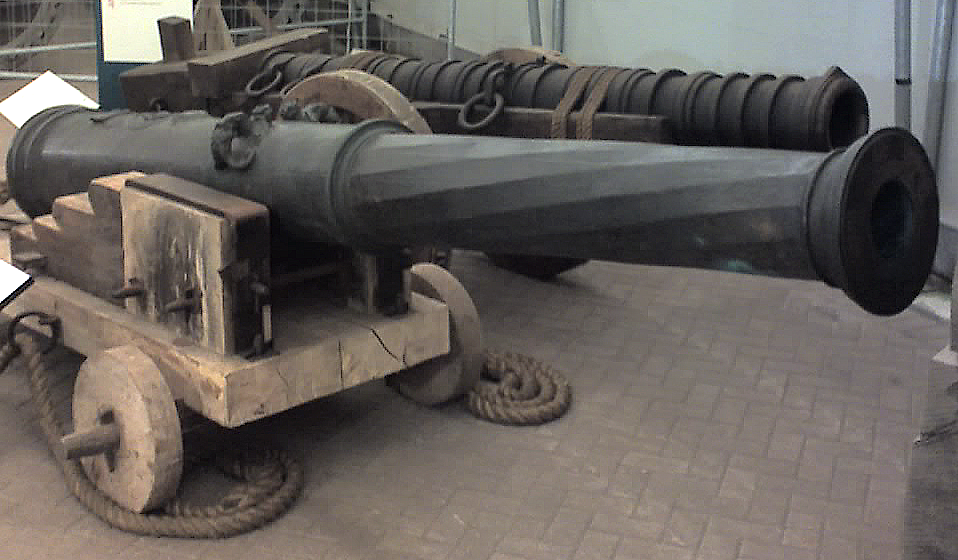
A replica 16th-century English bronze culverin (near) and an iron portpiece

The castle was already obsolete by the time it had been completed, as European military design had moved beyond curved bastions, embracing the angular designs seen in the later star forts. Nonetheless, it remained operational as an artillery fort for the rest of the century, with an initial garrison in 1540 of 24 men under the command of Chute, rising to 28 men and the captain after 1542. Although it had been fitted with gunloops for handguns from the very start, the castle initially relied heavily on archers for its own protection against attack from the land. It had stocks of 140 longbows and 560 sheaves of arrows in 1568, for example, probably for use by the local militia in the event of a war. Polearms were also stored there in considerable numbers, again probably for use by the militia.

Initially the fort was equipped with between 26 and 28 artillery pieces, including brass demi-cannons, culverins, demi-culverins and a falconet, and wrought-iron guns, such as portpieces, bases and slings. After 1568, the castle typically held around nine or ten guns for most of the 16th century, including cannons, demi-cannons, culverins and demi-culverins. Brass guns could fire more quickly, up to eight times an hour, and were safer to use than their iron equivalents. It is uncertain how far the castle's guns could have reached; analysis carried out in the 16th and 17th century on the ranges of artillery suggested that a culverin, for example, could hit at a target up to between 1,600 metres (5,200 ft) and 2,743 metres (8,999 ft) away.

In July 1545, the French carried out a raid at nearby Seaford, and the castle may have seen action against the French fleet. Soon, however, silt began to block the entrance to the Camber, threatening its use as an anchorage. Complaints were made to Parliament about the situation in 1548, and the authorities in Rye expressed fears in 1573 that the Camber was damaged beyond repair. By the end of the century, the reclamation of the surrounding marshes and the dumping of ballast by passing ships had accelerated the natural processes and the anchorage was ruined. The surrounding region was also less strategically important than it had once been: towns like Winchelsea and Rye were in decline, peace had been made with France in 1558 and military attention shifted towards the Spanish threat to the south-west of England. (Note: Some historians have been critical of Henry's expenditure on forts such as Camber, R. Allen Brown, for example, arguing that "the whole thing, was characteristically, a waste of money".)

The castle was garrisoned from 1553 onwards by between 26 and 27 men, including 17 gunners; they were led by a captain, Thomas Wilford having taken over this role by 1570. As the century went on, the castle became difficult to maintain. By 1568 the gun platforms were reported to be in "utter Ruing and decay", with repairs projected to be likely to cost around £60, although it is unclear whether the repairs were carried out. Tensions between Spain and England rose, and in 1584 Queen Elizabeth I spent £171 on repairs to the castle amid fresh fears of an invasion. War broke out the next year, and in 1588, the year of the Spanish Armada, a Jesuit priest called Father Darbysher, and Roger Walton, a spy in the pay of the Spanish, made plans to hand over the castle to an invading force of French and Spanish soldiers, although the conspiracy never came to fruition.

In 1593 there was a fresh crisis with Spain and the brass guns needed for the English navy were in short supply. Brass artillery pieces were therefore rounded up from the forts along the south coast, including Camber. The number of guns at the castle remained around the same, but the larger, brass culverins and demi-cannon were removed, being replaced with smaller iron demi-culverins, sakers and a minion. In 1594 another royal survey suggested that £95 of repair work was needed on the fortifications.

=== 17th – 19th centuries ===
==== Closure and English Civil War ====
Camber Castle went through several changes at the start of the 17th century. In 1610, Peter Temple was appointed as captain of the castle, and between 1610 and 1614 the garrison was reduced to 14 soldiers, including only 4 gunners, either as an effort to reduce costs or as a result of the changing types of artillery kept at the castle. The north and south bastions were filled in to form solid gun platforms around approximately 1613 and 1615, and an earth rampart called the Rampire was built up against the south corner of the castle. These solid bastions would have sacrificed living space, less in demand with a smaller garrison, but been much cheaper to maintain. (Note: The dating of the infilling of the bastions is uncertain from the documentary sources, although the archaeological deposits, combined with the documentary sources, has led English Heritage to propose the 1613–15 date range for the work.) Longbows fell out of use in warfare as archery in England declined, and were replaced by arquebuses and muskets, 46 of which were kept at the castle in 1614.

Sir John Temple took over as captain in 1615, being replaced by Robert Bacon by 1618. The fortification was now both antiquated and too far from the receding sea to be useful. In 1623 it was suggested that the castle should be closed, and King Charles I was briefed on the dilapidated condition of the fortification, which was now reportedly around 2 miles (3.2 km) from the sea. The local towns campaigned to keep the castle operational but in 1636 Charles issued an instruction to demolish it; the garrison, by now led by Captain Thomas Porter, left the next year, followed by the artillery.

When civil war broke out in 1642 between the supporters of Charles and those of Parliament, Camber Castle had not been entirely closed and was being used as a royal munitions store. The citizens of Rye sided with Parliament, which agreed that the weapons and stores in the castle should be removed and taken to the town for safe-keeping. Concerned that it might be seized by Royalist forces, Parliament went on to dismantle the castle over the next year, stripping the lead from the roof, blocking up the gunports and demolishing the living accommodation. As a result, Camber Castle was not used by the Royalists during the Second English Civil War in 1648, despite several other of the Device Forts along the south coast being occupied.

==== Ruins ====
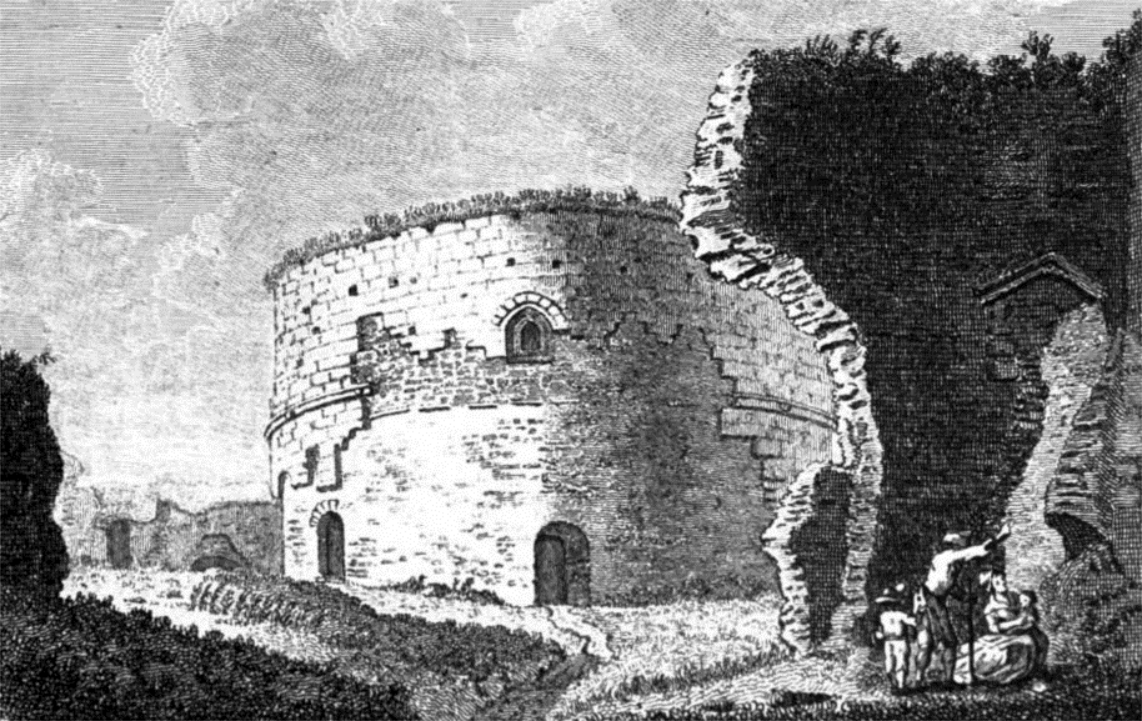
Engraving of the castle ruins in 1785

After the Restoration of Charles II to the throne in 1660, a royal survey of the castle found the fortification to be in ruins. An increasing number of visitors came to see the castle in the 18th and 19th centuries, with the north-east corner becoming a popular site for picnics. Writing in 1785, the antiquarian Francis Grose attributed the decline of the fortification to the changes in the local harbours and the superiority of the British Navy in protecting the coasts, observing that the castle's architecture "clearly shew the low state of military architecture" during the 16th century in England.

In response to the threat posed by France during the Napoleonic Wars, Lieutenant Colonel John Brown surveyed the castle in 1804 to examine whether the central keep could be turned into a Martello tower, a type of circular gun tower popular during this period. The scheme was not taken forward, although the defences of the surrounding coast line were much improved by the government. The painter J. M. W. Turner visited between 1805 and 1807 during the middle of this work, later depicting the castle in landscape paintings and sketches of the area.

=== 20th – 21st centuries ===
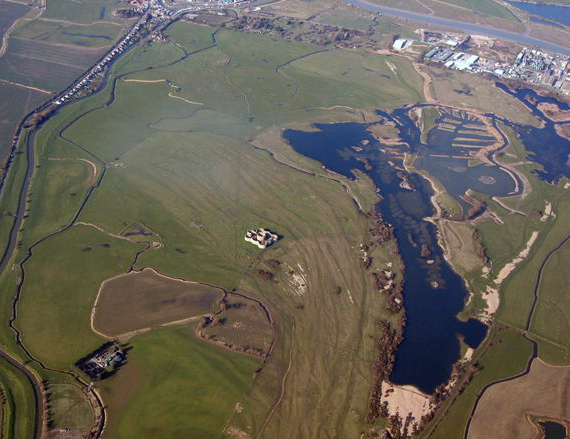
An aerial view of the castle (centre), with the River Brede (left), the modern Castle Water (right) and Rye Harbour (top right)

At the start of the 20th century Camber Castle and the surrounding farmland remained in private ownership and open to visitors. In 1931 there was a proposal to turn the keep into a golf clubhouse but the project was not taken forward and the facility was built at the nearby Castle Farm instead. A research team from the Victoria County History project visited the castle in 1935, resulting in the first – albeit cursory – historical analysis and survey of the fortification being published two years later.

By the 1940s, the castle structures were mostly covered with rubble and debris, interwoven with pathways created by the movement of visitors over the years. During the Second World War, the castle was used by the British Army, possibly as an early warning site fitted with anti-aircraft searchlights. In an area just to the north of the castle, the Starfish and Naval decoy sites were created to distract incoming German bombers from the town of Rye itself. Trenches were dug in the north bastion, and military training may have been conducted around the outskirts of the castle.

In the post-war years, archaeological interest in the castle grew. From 1951 onwards the Ministry of Works carried out a long-running research project into the Device Forts, the section on Camber being written by the historian Martin Biddle and finally published in 1982. Biddle carried out an exploratory archaeological survey of the site in 1962 and the following year the ruins were closed to allow more extensive archaeological excavation by the Ministry. These were initially carried out by Biddle and Alan Cook, with support from local school children and from young offenders from the Borstal institution in Dover.

The state took Camber Castle into guardianship in 1967, and the next year the government began a slow process of restoring the castle with the intention of eventually reopening it to the public, their efforts largely focusing on protecting the internal brick walls and wall-cores. Further excavations followed in the 1970s and early 1980s.

In 1977, the Department of National Heritage bought the castle from its owners. The government agency English Heritage took control of the castle in 1984 and a scheme to reopen the property to visitors was put forward in 1993. This included a final assessment of the archaeological work of the previous decades, and the castle finally opened to the public again in 1994. As of 2015, the castle is open to visitors through guided tours organised by the Rye Harbour Nature Reserve. The site is protected under UK law as a Grade I listed building.

== Architecture and landscape ==
=== Landscape ===
Camber Castle now lies on the Brede Level, a wide, reclaimed area of land between the modern towns of Rye and Winchelsea, about 1.5 kilometres (0.93 mi) from the sea. The surrounding pasture land is flat and only just above sea level, marked with numerous ridges formed by the retreating coastline over the centuries. On the eastern side of the fortification is Castle Water, a large, 20th-century gravel pit that is now flooded to form a wetland nature reserve.

A 1.8-metre (5 ft 11 in) defensive earthwork runs around the south and east sides of the castle; this was probably originally topped by a stone wall and designed to protect the castle from the sea, which would have then been much closer. The remains of a raised causeway, which once linked the isolated castle to the mainland, leads away for a short distance to the south-west from the earthwork before petering out. Marks from the holes that were dug to provide the materials for the infilling of the bastions in the early 17th century also survive around the outside of the castle.

=== Architecture ===
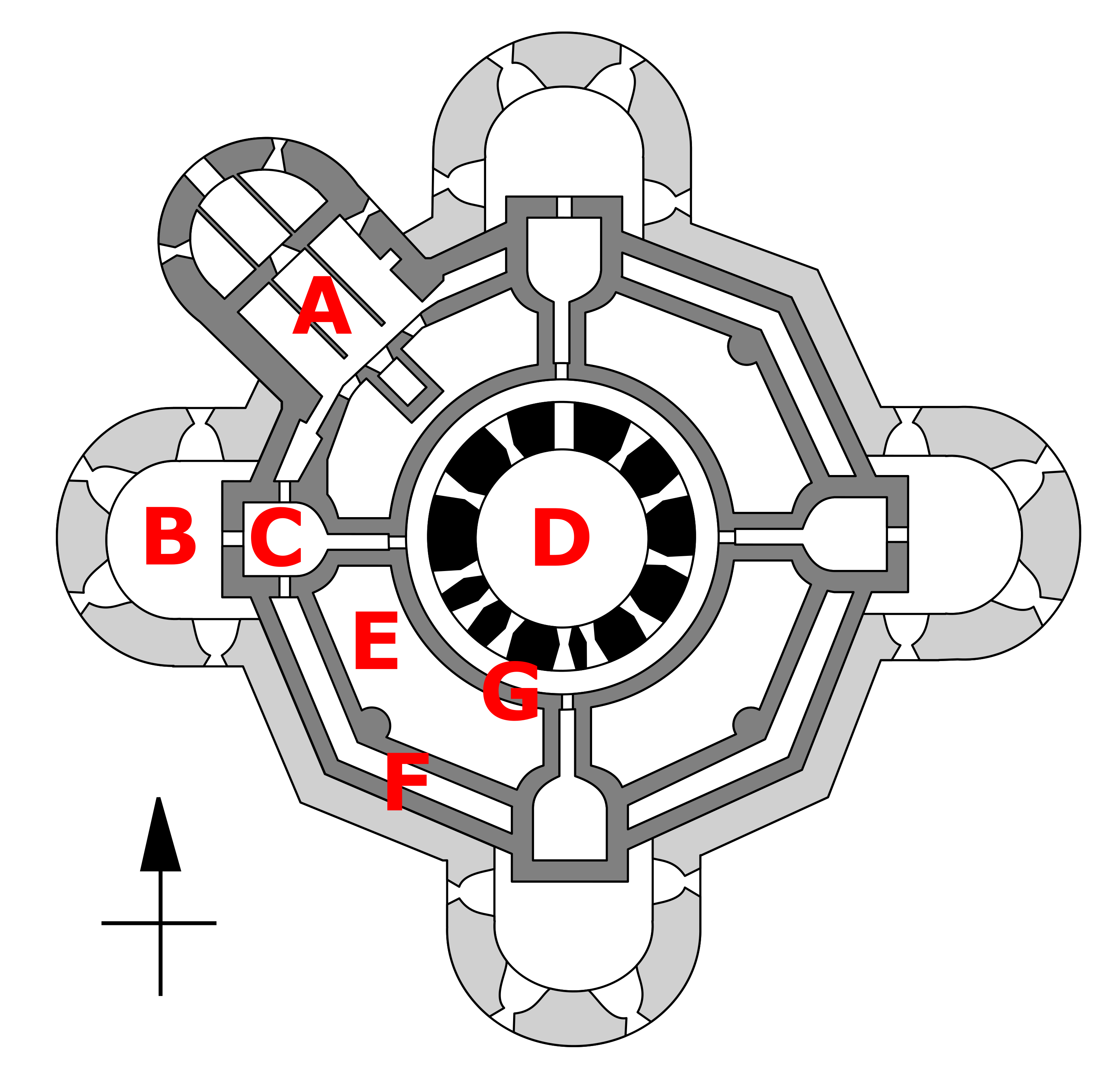
Plan of the castle: A – entrance basion; B – bastion; C – stirrup tower; D – keep; E – courtyard; F – gallery and octagonal wall; G – vaulted ring passage. Black – initial 1512–14 work; grey – 1539–40 extensions; light grey – 1543–44 redevelopment

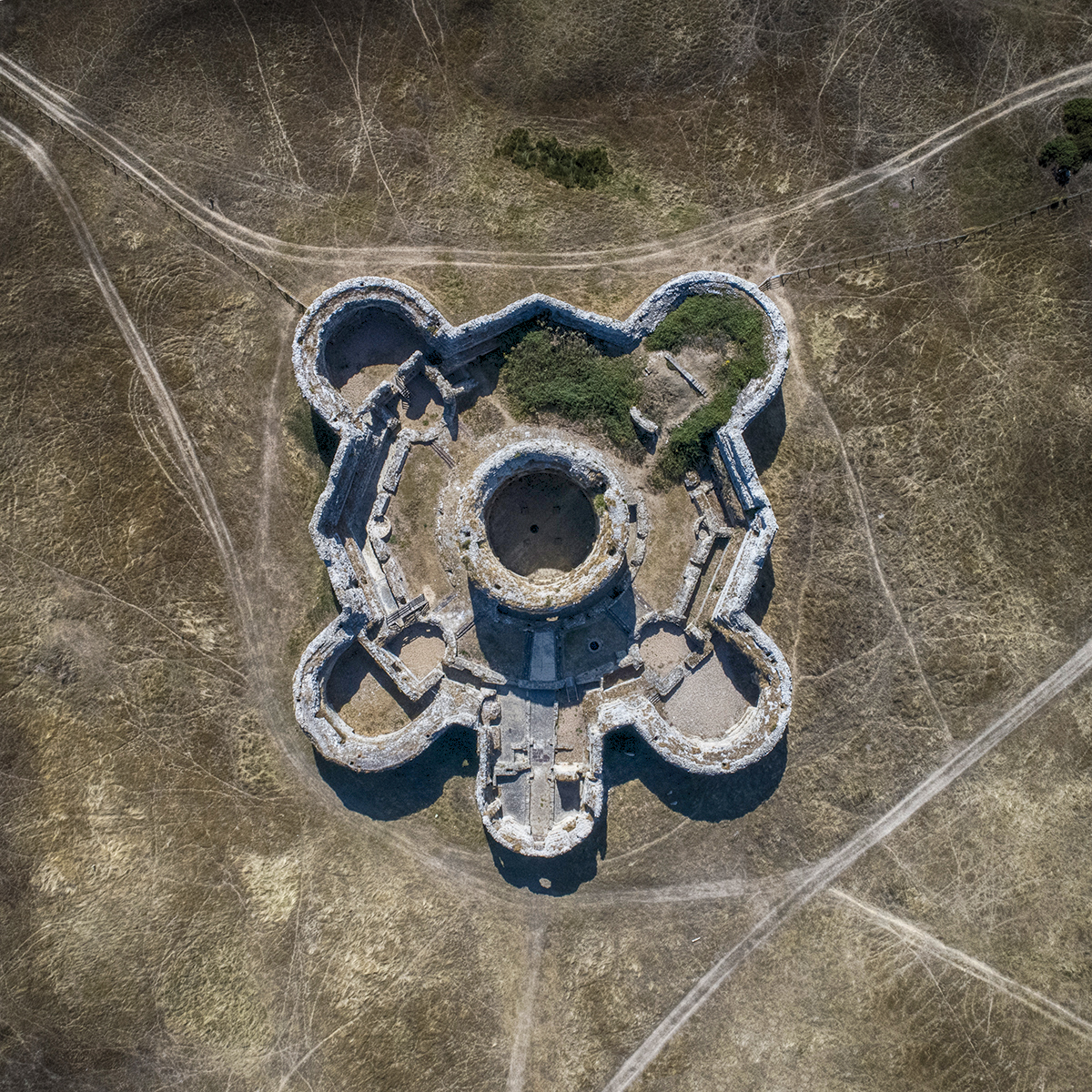
Camber Castle from above in August 2018

The three-storey castle itself has changed little since its completion in 1544, an incorporates elements from all of the three phases of building work in 1512–14, 1539–40 and 1543–44. It is now roofless but still standing up to 18 metres (59.1 ft) tall, and covers 0.73 acres (0.30 ha), almost as big as the largest of the Device Forts at Deal in Kent.

The first tower on the site was built from fine-grained yellow sandstone, with the later expansion making use of both yellow and grey sandstone, with imported Caen stone being used for the finer detailing. Ironstone, siltstone and brown sandstone rubble and boulders was used for the core of the castle walls, some of it taken from the local cliffs.

The castle would have been entered through the entrance bastion. The core of this building was constructed in the second phase of work on the castle and was initially a square one-storey construct, 15 by 10.5 metres (49.2 by 34.4 ft) across, before being extended forward by an additional 9 metres (29.5 ft) to form a circular bastion; an additional floor was then added on top in the third phase. The internal walls have mostly been destroyed, but the ground floor chambers would have been used for administration, and possibly as living rooms for the deputy captain. The first floor would have formed a high-status set of chambers for the use of the captain, and included large windows, fireplaces and a private garderobe, but most of this storey has been destroyed. A special German cocklestove was probably fitted into the chambers for the use of Philip Chute, the first captain of the castle, and was illustrated with pictures of Landsknecht soldiers and Protestant German leaders; only fragments of the stove have survived.

In the centre of the fortification was the keep, built up from the round tower of 1512–14, and 6.7 metres (22 ft) of the original building's walls were incorporated into the new design. The original tower had ten gunports embedded at ground level in its 3.05-metre-thick (10.0 ft) walls, but these were blocked up in the second phase of building. The keep would originally had a parapet running around its roof, which was initially flat but converted to a ridged design in the third phase of work. The ground floor was laid in brick and had a brick and stone-lined well to supply it with water. The keep had two fireplaces, but these were small and not intended for cooking – indeed, the final version of the keep was probably never used as a living space. The first floor windows were added in the final phase of work; they were not intended for use as gunports, but they had bars and shutters, so could have been easily secured in the event of an attack.

An underground vaulted ring passageway, only 1.9 metres (6 ft 3 in) high ran around the outside of the keep, with similar covered radial passageways leading off to each of the bastions; the passageways are now ruined. A cobbled courtyard surrounded the keep, separating it from the external defences, and containing a well in the north-west corner. Underground passageways led from the entrance bastion to outside the castle walls, either to allow the garrison to escape in an emergency or to assault a besieging force.

The outer part of the castle was defended by an octagonal wall, which linked the four stirrup turrets and bastions that formed the main defences for the castle. This wall had initially been built in the second phase of work on the castle, but was then supplemented in the final phase with an additional 2.4-metre-thick (7.9 ft) exterior facing, and was originally finished with a gun embrasure along each section, and parapets. A two-storey gallery, which provided relatively spacious barrack accommodation for the garrison, ran all the way around the inside of the wall, although only the ground floor of the gallery now survives. The gallery would have been lit by windows facing into the courtyard. The Rampire earthwork built in the early 17th century lies across the south and south-east parts of the defences, where the gunports were blocked up with stone when the earth was piled up along the inside of the castle.

The four stirrup towers are two storeys tall, 6 by 6.2 metres (19.7 by 20.3 ft) across internally, with 0.8-metre-thick (2.6 ft) walls, flat at the front and curved at the back. They would originally have been topped by firing platforms, with gunloops around the inside of the fortification enabling their occupants to fire into the courtyard if necessary. The bastions built around the outside of the towers in the third phase of work are 19 metres (62.3 ft) wide internally and each extend 12 metres (39.4 ft) from their respective stirrup tower, with 3.6-metre-thick (12 ft) walls. Most of the bastions had a single internal gun room with a robust gun deck on top, but the West Bastion was used as a kitchen and the interior was fitted with two circular ovens and a range for cooking. The bastions would have been connected by a wall-walk and parapets, but these have since been lost. The south stirrup tower and bastion remains partially buried as a result of the construction of the Rampire.

== See also ==
- Castles in Great Britain and Ireland
- List of castles in England

== Bibliography ==
- Biddle, Martin; Hiller, Jonathon; Scott, Ian; Streeten, Anthony (2001). Henry VIII's Coastal Artillery Fort at Camber Castle, Rye, East Sussex: An Archaeological Structural and Historical Investigation. Oxford, UK: Oxbow Books. ISBN 0-904220-23-0.
- Brown, R. Allen (1989). Castles From the Air. Cambridge, UK: Cambridge University Press. ISBN 0-521-32932-9.
- Grose, Francis (1785). The Antiquities of England and Wales, Volume 5. London, UK: S. Hooper. OCLC 699066348.
- Hale, J. R. (1983). Renaissance War Studies. London, UK: Hambledon Press. ISBN 0-907628-17-6.
- Harrington, Peter (2007). The Castles of Henry VIII. Oxford, UK: Osprey Publishing. ISBN 978-1-4728-0380-1.
- Lowry, Bernard (2006). Discovering Fortifications: From the Tudors to the Cold War. Princes Risborough, UK: Shire Publications. ISBN 978-0-7478-0651-6.
- Shanes, Eric (2008). The Life and Masterworks of J. M. W. Turner. New York, US: Parkstone Press. ISBN 978-1-85995-681-6.
- Walton, Steven A. (2010). "State Building Through Building for the State: Foreign and Domestic Expertise in Tudor Fortification". Osiris. 25 (1): 66–84. doi:10.1086/657263. S2CID 144384757.
