= Carlisle city walls =

Historic wall built around Carlisle, England

Coordinates: 54.894°N 2.939°W

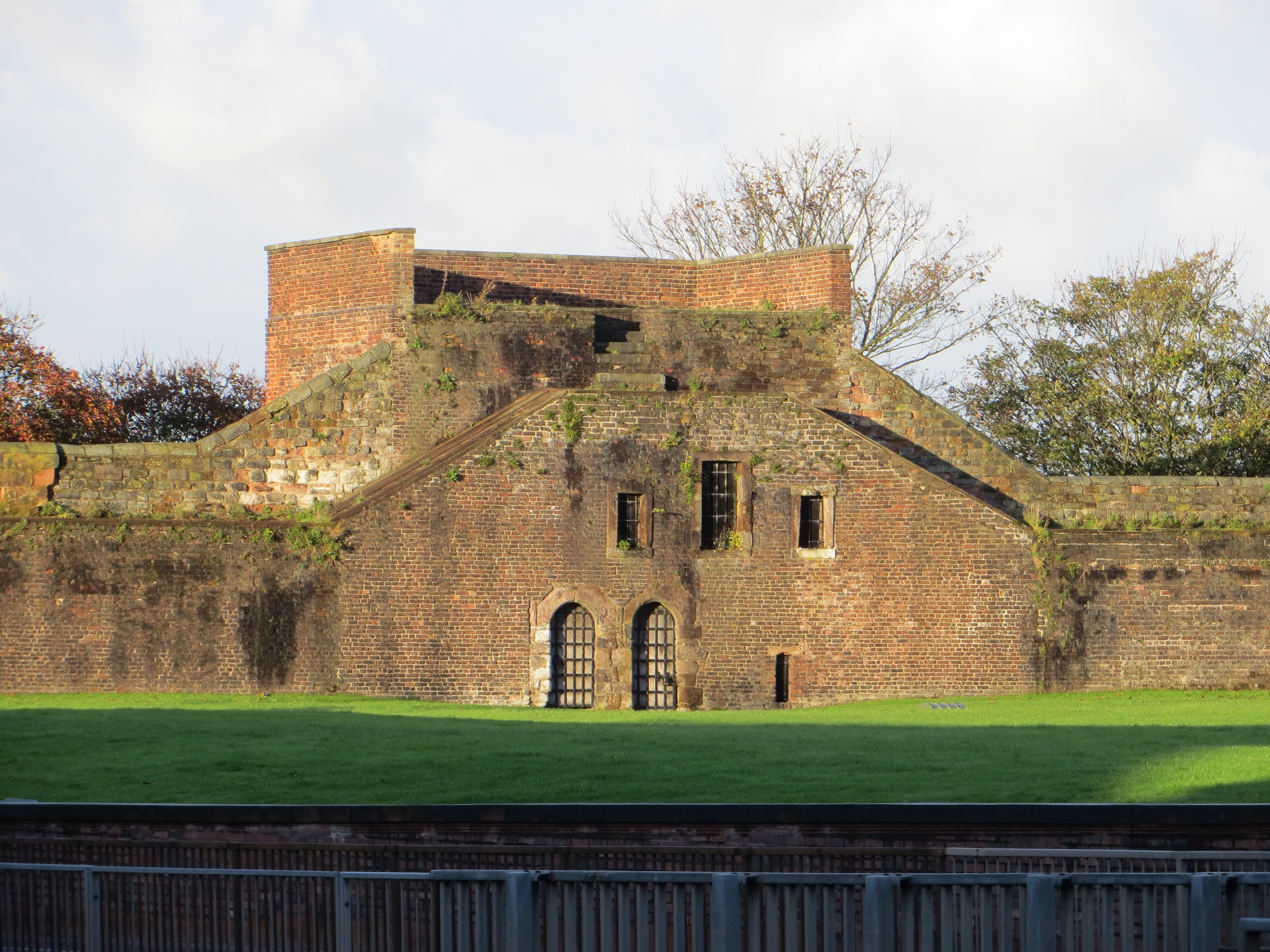
Tile Tower

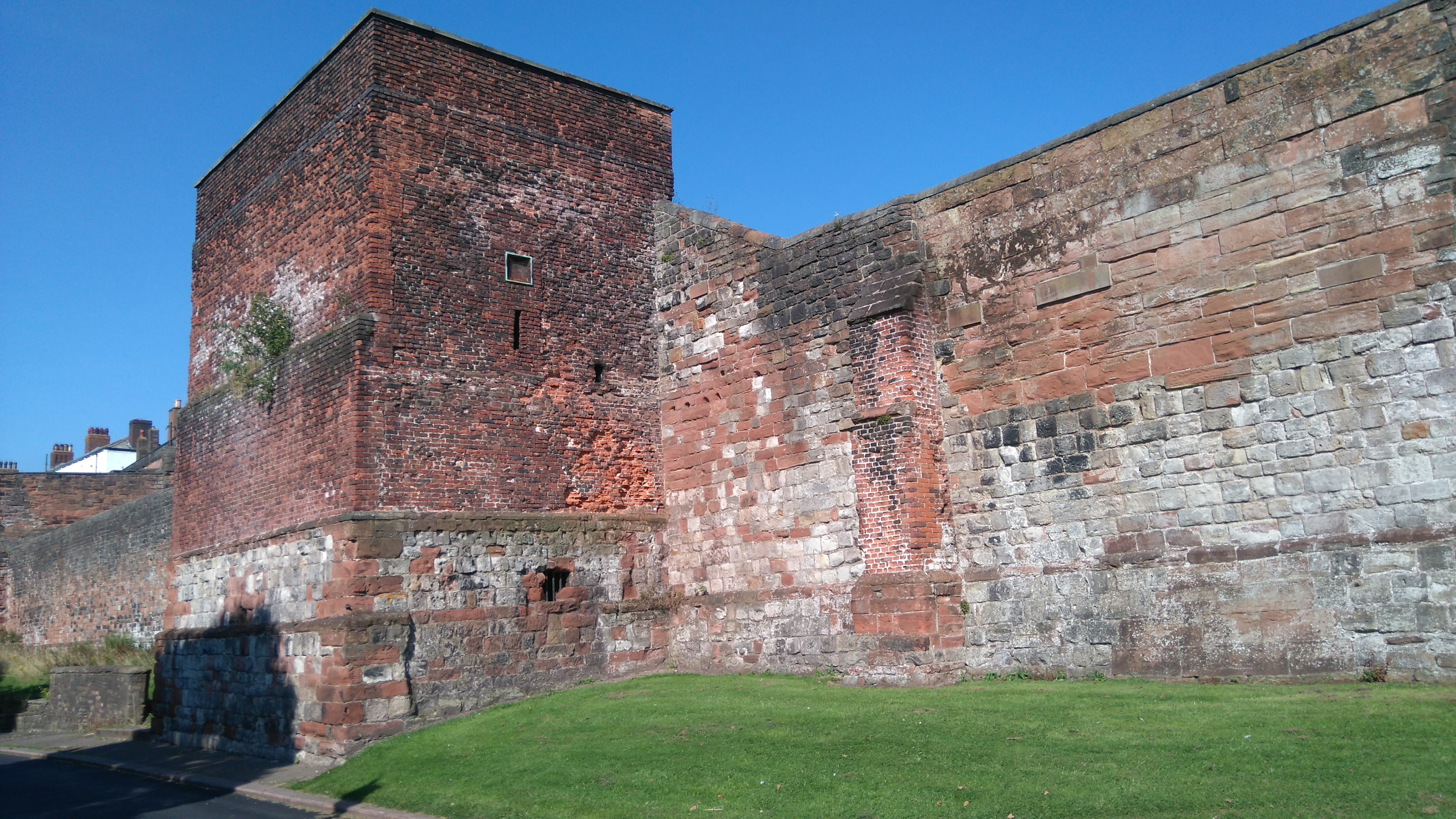
Tile Tower (from outside walls)

Carlisle city walls were a defensive structure surrounding the centre of Carlisle, Cumbria. The city walls ran from Carlisle Castle in the north-west of the city to The Citadel in the south-east. Between these points, the city was protected by the former North and East Walls (demolished around 1811) and the West Walls which remain largely intact. The line of the walls can still be followed with the exception of the southernmost end of the West Wall which has been built over. The perimeter, including the castle, is approximately 2.2 kilometres (1.4 mi) which is comparable to Southampton town walls but less than Chester city walls.

== Construction ==
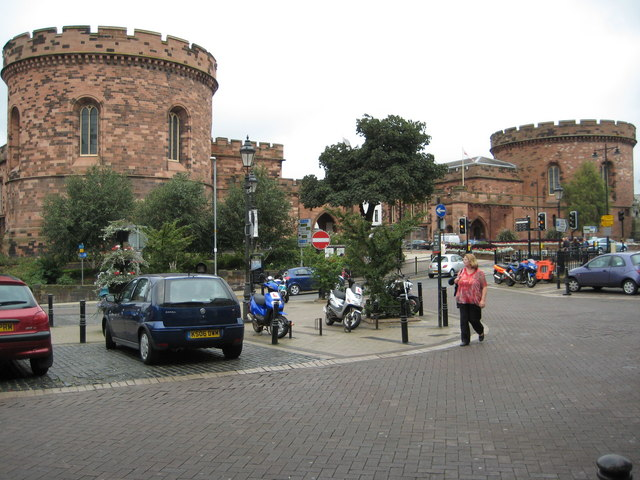
The Citadel from outside Carlisle railway station

The Roman city of Carlisle was walled but the mediaeval walls were built to replace timber structures in the latter half of the twelfth-century. The North Walls ran roughly east-southeastwards from the castle to Scotchgate and then on to Philipson's Tower. Here it turned roughly south to The Citadel. The Citadel was built as a gate by Stefan von Haschenperg in the 1540s to replace an earlier structure. It was later blocked and access to the city from the south was diverted around it through a new gate, Englishgate, built between The Citadel and Collier's Gate.

== Demolition ==
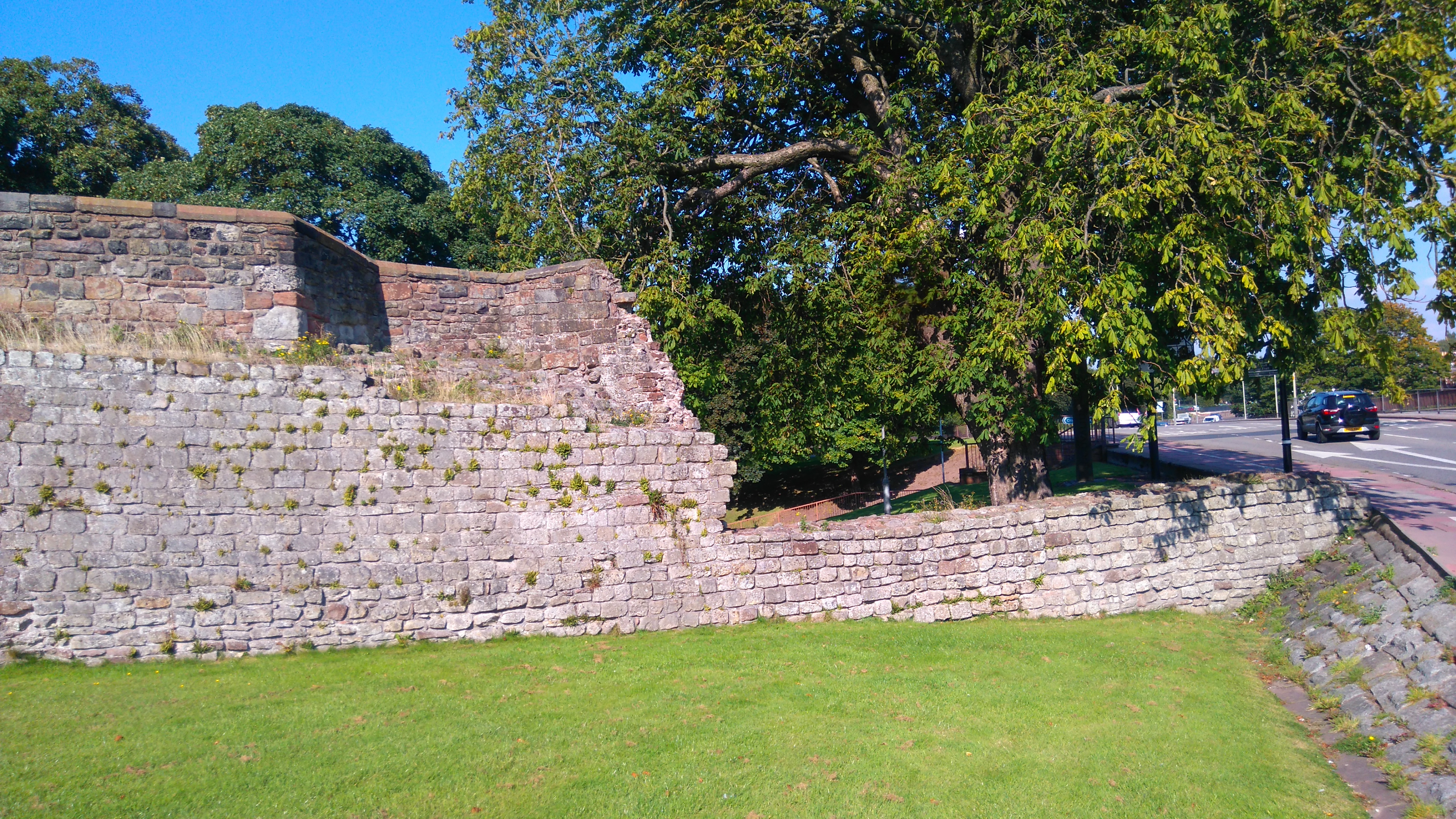
Surviving fragment of north wall

The walls fell into disrepair at various times. A 1684 survey reported that The Citadel had been almost destroyed by the Scots. By the end of the eighteenth-century, the need for easier access for traffic and the need for better ventilation of the crowded city led to demands for the walls' demolition and an Act of Parliament was passed in 1807. The stone was used to redevelop The Citadel as a court building and in the construction of a new Eden Bridge to the north of the city. Both these projects involved Thomas Telford and Robert Smirke.

== More recent changes ==
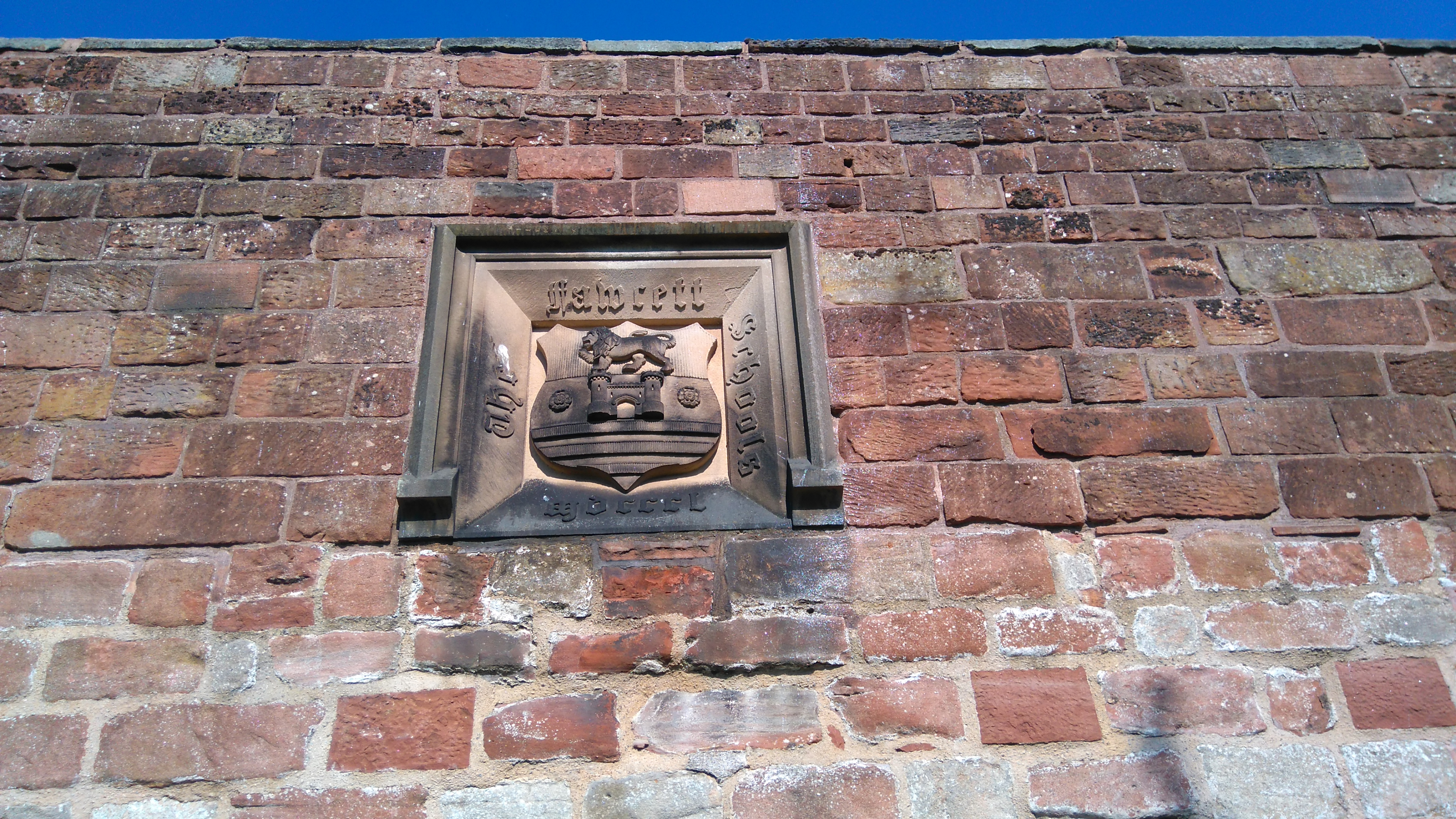
Site of The Fawcett School

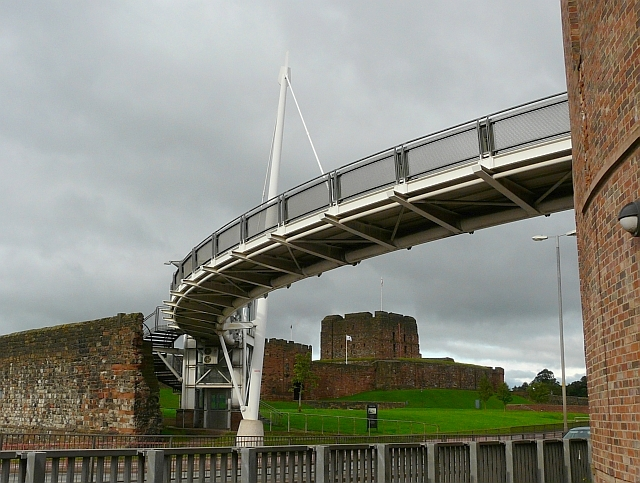
Irish Gate footbridge

The West Walls are still needed to retain a former river cliff on the River Caldew and were not demolished. They have however been considerably altered over the years. Comparisons between old engravings and current archaeological evidence suggest the wall has been straightened. Between the bridge and the castle, there were houses built up against the walls until 1952. Other buildings erected against the walls have been largely removed so the walls are visible again. Remaining buildings have been listed because they incorporate wall fragments.

Short lengths of the North and West Walls run south from the castle to a city centre bypass that separates the castle from the city centre. The construction of the bypass required the existing gap in the West Walls to be widened and the surviving fragment of the North Walls to be truncated further. The gap in the West Walls includes the site of Irishgate and this is commemorated by a modern footbridge.
