= Camber, East Sussex =

Village and parish in East Sussex, England

Coordinates: 50.94°N 0.80°E

Camber
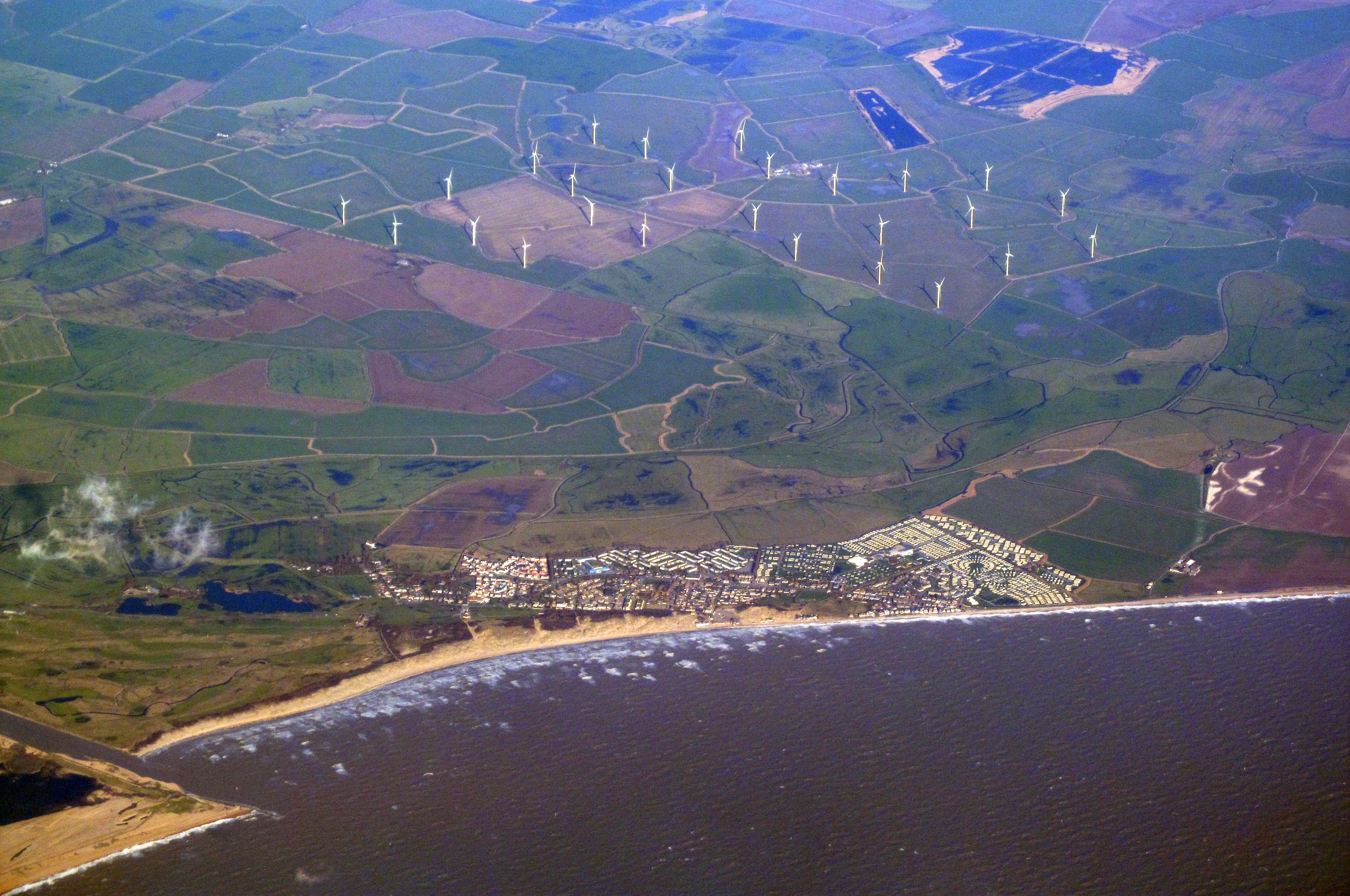
- Aerial view, showing the proximity of Little Cheyne Court Wind Farm

- Location within East Sussex
- Area: 14.1 km^{2} (5.4 sq mi)
- Population: 1,265 (Parish-2011)
  - Density: 87/sq mi (34/km^{2})
- OS grid reference: TQ966188
  - London: 56 miles (90 km) NW
- District: Rother
- Shire county: East Sussex
- Region: South East
- Country: England
- Sovereign state: United Kingdom
- Post town: RYE
- Postcode district: TN31
- Dialling code: 01797
- Police: Sussex
- Fire: East Sussex
- Ambulance: South East Coast
- UK Parliament: Hastings and Rye
- Website: Camber Parish Council

Camber is a village and civil parish in the Rother district of East Sussex, England, 3 miles (4.8 km) south-east of Rye. The village is located behind the sand dunes that occupy the estuary of the River Rother, where the seaside settlement of Camber Sands is situated. In 2011 the parish had a population of 1265.

The village of Camber takes its name from the Camber (la Chambre) the huge embayment of the English Channel located between Rye, old Winchelsea and Old Romney that was gradually lost to "innings" and silting-up following changes to the coastline and the changed course of the Eastern Rother since the Middle Ages.

== History ==
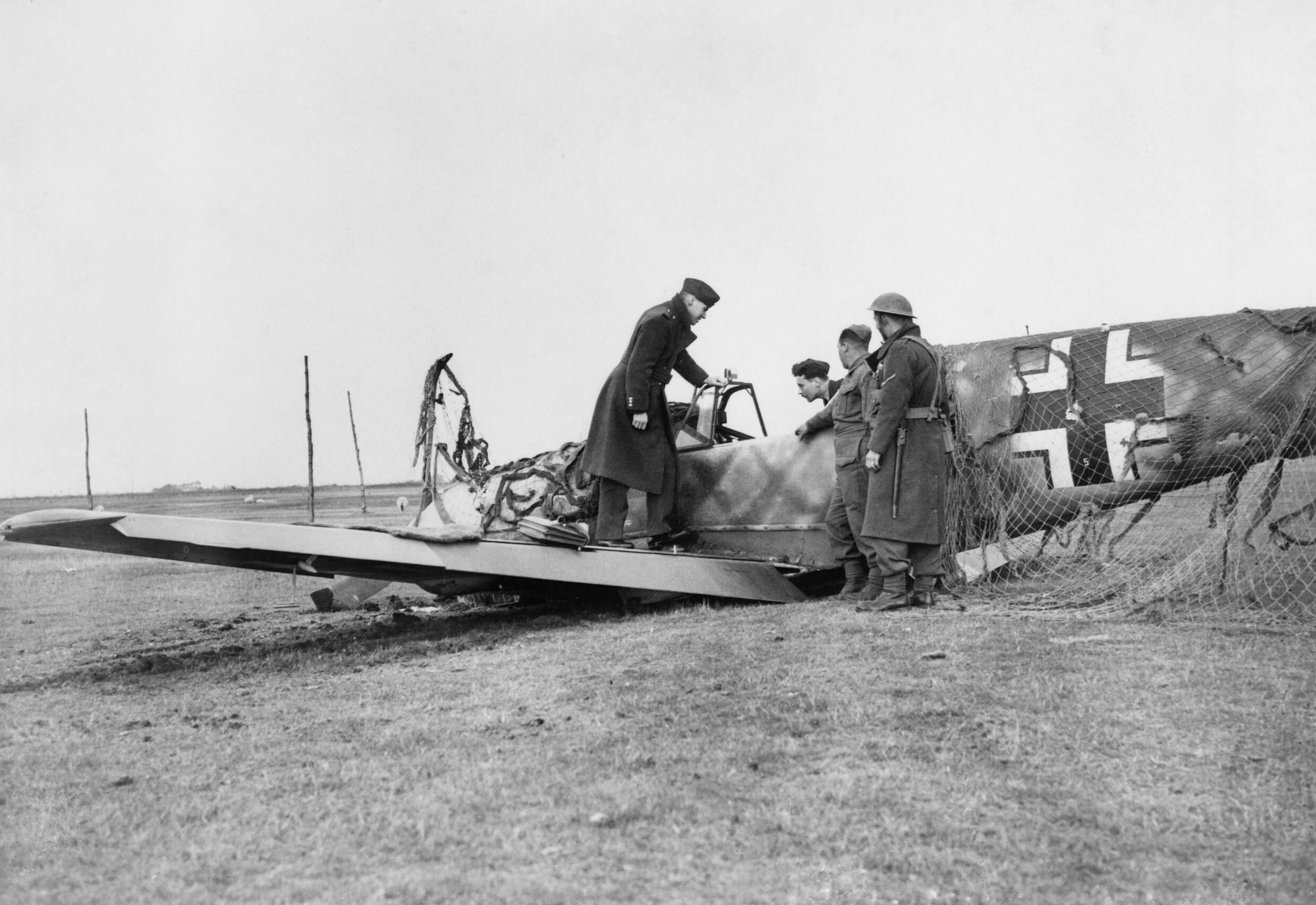
Messerschmitt Bf 109E-4 (W.Nr. 1988) Black 7 of 5./JG 54, which belly-landed at Broomhill Farm, at 9.30am on 25 October 1940, with Oberleutnant Joachim Schypek captured

Camber came into its own with the game of golf: it was originally a collection of fishermen's dwellings. By the early 1890s, the number of visitors to Rye increased as tourism became more prevalent. One result of this was the building, in 1894, of Rye Golf Links in the area of sand dunes which occupy the shores of Rye Bay. The Royal William Hotel opened that year, and gradually the new village expanded. The Rye and Camber Tramway, a tourist railway originally opened for the members of the golf links to carry their gear, was opened in 1895; it closed to the public at the outbreak of World War II and never reopened.

Camber Castle, otherwise known as Winchelsea Castle, was built by Henry VIII to guard the western entrance to "the Camber" in the 16th Century and is located halfway between Rye and Winchelsea on the other side of the river.

Camber parish was formed on 1 April 1956 from the merger of the parishes of Broomhill and St Thomas the Apostle, Winchelsea.

== Holiday resort ==
The area has two holiday parks and several caravan sites adjacent to the beach. There are also seasonal shops and entertainments.

== Landmarks ==
Part of the Site of Special Scientific Interest known as Dungeness, Romney Marsh and Rye Bay is within the parish. This is a site of national biological and geological importance with various habitats such as shingle, saltmarsh, sand dunes and saline lagoons.

== Events ==
Each year in November, the Rhythm Riot Festival in Camber.
