= Carlisle Citadel =

Historic building in Carlisle, Cumbria, England

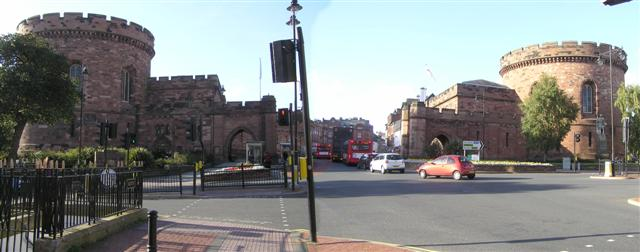
- Carlisle Citadel with the Western Tower (on the left) and the Eastern Tower (on the right)

- Location within Cumbria
- 54.8920°N 2.9334°W
- Location: Carlisle, Cumbria

History
- Built: 1541

Site notes
- Architect: Stephen von Haschenperg

Listed Building – Grade I
- Official name: Former Nisi Prius Court
- Designated: 1 June 1949
- Reference no.: 1196940

Listed Building – Grade I
- Official name: Former Crown Court
- Designated: 1 June 1949
- Reference no.: 1196939

Carlisle Citadel or The Citadel is a group of buildings on the site of a former early modern fortress on English Street in Carlisle, Cumbria. It comprises two towers, both of which are Grade I listed buildings: the Nisi Prius Courthouse and the former Crown Court.

== History ==
The citadel was commissioned by King Henry VIII to replace the medieval Botcher's gate, which was a gateway through the city walls. The new facility, which was designed by Stefan von Haschenperg as a medieval fortress, was completed in 1541. It ceased to be a fortress and became a prison in 1611. The Eastern Tower was modified to designs by Thomas Telford and Sir Robert Smirke and converted for use as a Nisi Prius Court (i.e. civil courts) in 1812. The Western Tower was completely rebuilt to designs by Thomas Telford and Sir Robert Smirke and converted for use as the Crown Court in 1822.

The citadel continued to be used as the local facility for dispensing justice but, following the implementation of the Local Government Act 1888, which established county councils in every county, it also became the offices and meeting place for Cumberland County Council. After amalgamation with Westmorland County Council in 1974, Cumbria County Council continued to use the facilities at the Citadel as offices. The County Council also occupied a series of Victorian houses on Portland Square, Brunswick Street and Alfred Street North in Carlisle as well as Lonsdale House in Lower Gaol Yard.

The citadel ceased to function as a judicial facility after the new Courts of Justice in Earl Street was completed in 1992. It also ceased to function as a municipal facility when, as a cost-saving measure, the County Council moved to a single facility, Cumbria House, in Botchergate in December 2016. The county council submitted proposals to the Government for funding to redevelop the Citadel area in April 2016 and published a plan to convert it into a campus for the University of Cumbria in May 2020.
