= Little Cheyne Court Wind Farm =

Wind farm in England

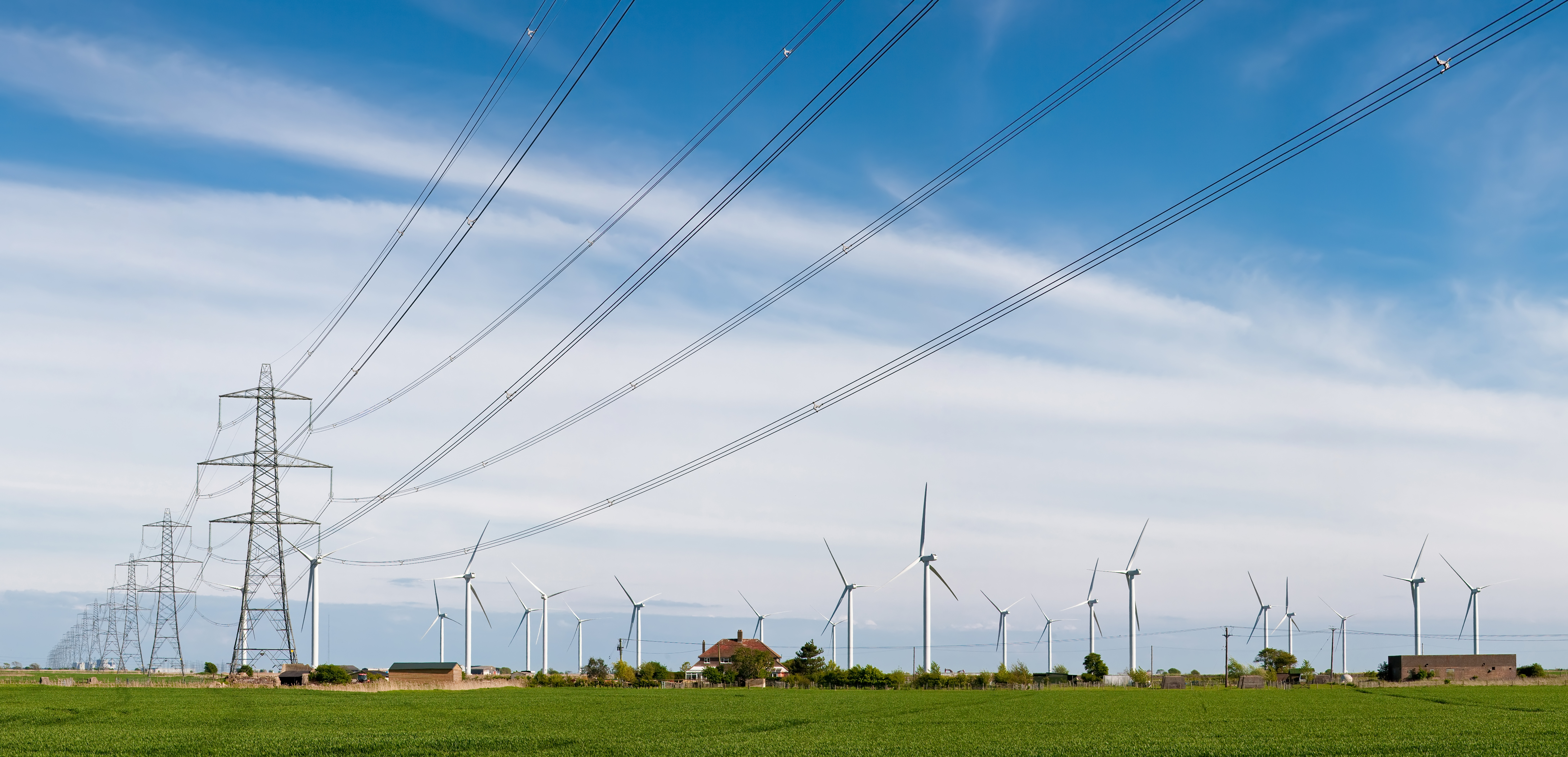
- Little Cheyne Court wind farm, close to power lines running to Dungeness Nuclear Power Station
- Country: England, United Kingdom
- Location: Romney Marsh
- Coordinates: 50°57′45″N 00°49′13″E
- Status: Operational
- Commission date: April 2009

Power generation
- Units operational: 26 x 2.3 MW
- Make and model: Nordex: N90
- Nameplate capacity: 59.8 MW

External links
- Commons: Related media on Commons

The Little Cheyne Court Wind Farm is located 7 kilometres (4.3 miles) west of Lydd on Romney Marsh. It was built by npower renewables and cost around £50 million. The 26 wind turbines, each 115 metres (377 ft) high, are distributed over an area of 4 km^{2} (1.5 sq mi) with peak generation of 59.8 MW.

== Opposition to the windfarm ==
The site has proved controversial and has been opposed by parish, district and county councils, the local MP and other groups as detrimental to the visual appearance of the Marsh and a threat to wildlife. However, they were overruled by Central Government, and the turbines were erected in the period June - October 2008. The DTI indicated that a significant number of local people submitted comments in favour of the project, whilst a consistent 70% to 80% of the UK public support wind farms. Some local campaigners still oppose the development, attracting accusations of "rural nimbyism" and being under the "sinister" influence of the nuclear lobby. Conversely, campaigners for the siting attract accusations of "professional" self-interest and of hiding behind the truism that obviously renewable energy is beneficial.

The RSPB, CPRE Kent and English Nature all objected to the use of this particular site as a wind farm on environmental grounds. The proximity of the site to the internationally important RSPB reserve and the land's status as an SSSI were particularly controversial.
