= Stefan von Haschenperg =

German military engineer (14th century)

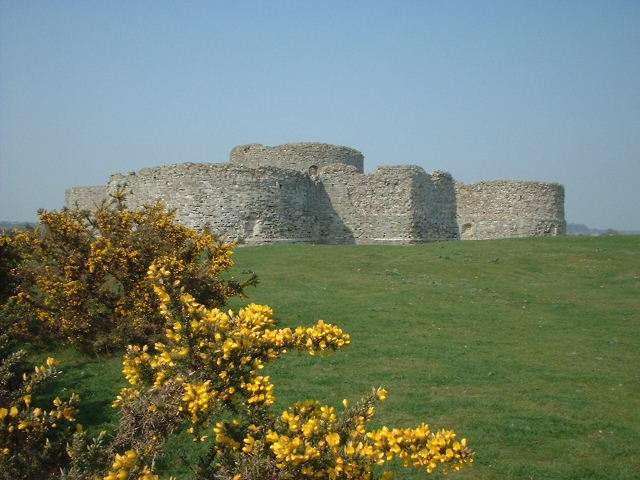
Camber Castle Haschenperg directed re-construction work 1539–1540

Stefan von Haschenperg was a military engineer employed by Henry VIII of England in the 1540s.

== Career ==
Very little is known of Stefan's career, however he was mentioned as a gentleman of Moravia, and subject of Bohemia, in a letter from the Regent of the Netherlands to Henry VIII in 1544. He spoke in Polish to sailors of a fleet of Charles V in 1539. He seems to have first offered his services as armourer and architect to Henry VIII in 1535; giving a note to the Duke of Suffolk to pass to Thomas Cromwell and the King.

Stefan was part of the design team for the Device Forts at Sandgate and Camber Castles, and the gun emplacements made of earth on the Downs. In November 1540 he went to the Pale of Calais. The French ambassador in London, Charles de Marillac, heard of this and reported to Francis I of France that the "German" engineer had gone to design new bulwarks. Stefan "the Almain" crossed the border into Ardres for a day to spy out the French fortification there for Henry VIII. However, Stefan was not fully trusted by the Privy Council, who instructed Henry FitzAlan, the Deputy of Calais, that "in no wise they should suffer him to view the town of Calais or to see the secrets of the same."

In 1541, Stefan was directing work on new fortifications at Carlisle, and after a dispute with Thomas Gower, he was promoted to sole surveyor of the works. He was sacked by the Privy Council two years later for having, "lewdlye behaved himself," and spent a great treasure to no purpose. Stefan may have been the military engineer mentioned by Eustace Chapuys as returning to the Scottish border in January 1542 after having planned and commenced a line of defences. On 17 July 1543 Stefan came before the Privy Council at Oatlands Palace and was reminded of his promise to make recompense for any faults.

Stefan then went abroad. On 20 August 1544 Stefan contacted the English ambassador in Brussels, Sir Edward Carne. He offered information on Scottish recruiters who were looking for military experts for the war with England. Stefan said the Scots had made an offer to the uncle of Hans, a German plumber working at Hull, and he hoped Carne would write to Henry VIII in his favour if he found out more information. Stefan then went to Antwerp and Lübeck, and wrote to Henry VIII in 1545, asking for his old job back. He suggested a scheme for bringing fresh water to Nonsuch Palace. The last letter included a woodcut picture of a coin; and another of a combined horse and windmill, titled, "Eine wunderlicte roswintmulle, Emden, 1545". Stefan offered new chemical discoveries and the design of a water pumping mill;

- the secret of smelting tin and lead ore with coal rather than charcoal,
- making Roman vitriol, used in the manufacture of black cloth, in England,
- making saltpetre in one place without fetching ingredients,
- an art unknown to Vitruvius, Archimedes, and Ctesibius, a horse driven water pumping mill, a marvel fit for 'Non-Such' Palace.

Stefan said he would have tried out the last idea at his own house in England. He probably meant St Thomas's Mills at Stratford, London, which Henry had given him, then taken away in 1544. Stefan seems not to have found work, but he did come back to England. On 9 January 1547, the Imperial ambassador in London, François van der Delft, wrote to Mary of Austria to ask what he should do about Haschenperg. Stefan and his wife had come to London thinking that Mary's letters would get his job back. Van der Delft suggested he should not intercede between Henry VIII and his servant. Stefan then became a steward of Jan Dubravius, Bishop of Olomouc, in Bohemia. The Bishop subsequently wrote a treatise on the construction of fish ponds.

Despite the circumstances of Stefan's dismissal from English royal service, and the shortcomings of some his buildings, B. H. St. J. O'Neil found it likely that his presence in the royal works account for some of features of the Henrician forts that correspond most closely to models proposed by Albrecht Dürer.

== Works ==
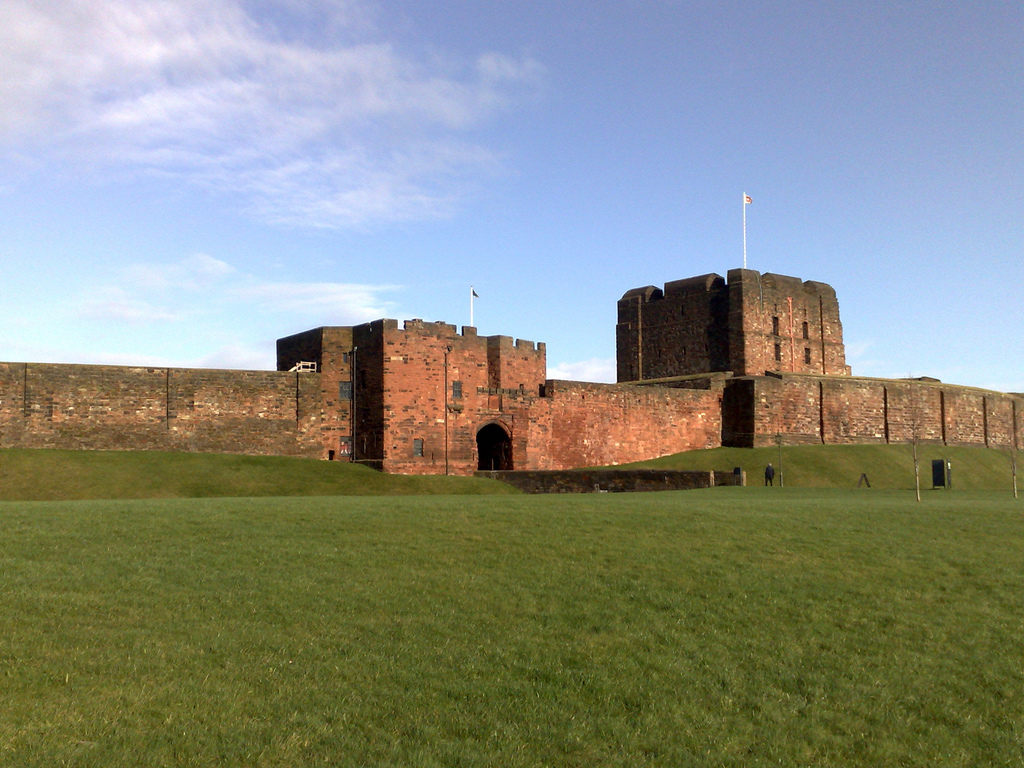
Carlisle Castle Haschenperg lowered the medieval keep to form a gun emplacement of a type known as a Cavalier

- Calais Marshes, November 1540.
- Camber Castle, 1539–1540.
- Sandgate Castle, 1539–1540
- The Downs bulwarks between Sandown and Walmer Castles; Great turf bulwark; Little turf bulwark; Great White bulwark; Walmer bulwark.
- Carlisle Citadel, replaced medieval Botcher's gate with twin round bastions and blockhouse.
- Carlisle Castle, lowered the Keep; new battery in front of the gatehouse.

At Camber, Stefan appears in the accounts for the second phase of work in 1539 and 1540 as a frequent visitor; "Master Stevyn the devysour". There was accommodation for him on site in the "Devisour's Chamber". In these works Haschenperg used flammable pitch to seal basement floors and even some of the roofs. His additions were quickly altered by subsequent works. Martin Biddle characterised his work as, "horrifyingly over-complex in its internal circulation, the result presumably of a wish to divide the castle into self-contained sectors in the event of enemy penetration", and added that Camber phase II and Sandgate are naive in comparison with Walmer, Sandown, and Deal Castles. Haschenperg constructed the earthen gun emplacements on the Downs between the latter castles.

Stefan worked at Sandgate Castle at the same time as Camber, and signed the accounts, though he was not always present. Haschenperg disagreed with other officials over the roofing materials. Stefan preferred tar and pitch for roofing rather than the more obvious choice of less flammable lead.

In November 1540 Stefan was sent to help site artillery emplacements in the Calais marshes. As a foreigner he was not wholly trusted and his colleagues were asked not to let him view the secrets of the town. Stefan produced a map and subsequently six bulwarks were built as part of a larger project devised by Henry VIII. They were called; Hooke's, Crabbar's, Bootes, Ballingham, and Andren bulwarks.

Stefan joined the work at Carlisle on 4 June 1541 in joint authority with Thomas Gower. He immediately complained to the Privy Council about the mismanagement of the works and the behaviour of Sir Thomas Wentworth, Captain of the Castle. The Council found for Stefan, and Gower was sent to Berwick. Over the next year and a half, £5000 was spent. Stefan lowered and strengthened the old castle keep to make it an artillery platform. New work included the half-moon battery which covered the inner bailey, and two small bulwarks or caponiers in the outer moat. Then the medieval Botcher gate in the town wall was replaced by the fortress called Carlisle Citadel. On 1 December 1542, Stefan was called to London and asked to bring the plans of next year's works. At the same time, Thomas Wharton and the Bishop of Carlisle were asked to view and report on his proceedings at Carlisle. With accusations of mismanagement, before the works were completed, on 17 July 1543, the Privy Council recalled his promise to recompense the king for any wasted resources and asked him to make sureties for payment;

"Steven, Allemaigne, having hadde charge long tyme off certeyne off the Kinges Highnes' buyldinges and fortifications, for as muche as itt appered he hadde lewedlye behaved himselff in the sayde charge, and hadde spent the King a great tresour, and all to no purpose, ... was this day called before the Cownsell."

By 17 November 1543, the Privy council ordered that Stefan was to be replaced by John Rogers and a new Clerk of works. His English career was over.

Stefan's design for the citadel at Carlisle was criticised by Francis Knollys in June 1569. He thought its three artillery platforms were vulnerable to attack because "it flanketh not itselffe very well, ... and the cownter skarffe serveth to cover the approach of the enemies." The platforms for mounting the guns were made of timber and decayed, so Knollys suggested filling the masonry walls with earth. He estimated the scrap value of the lead recovered from the platform would leave a profit of £200.
