= William Knell (actor) =

- Born: unknown
- Died: June 13, 1587
- Occupation: actor
- Years active: 1583-1587
- Spouse: Rebecca Edwards (m. 1586; died 1587)

William Knell (died June 13, 1587) was an Elizabethan era actor who played lead roles for the Queen's Men in the 1580s. It has been speculated that his sudden death in a brawl with another actor, while on tour in Thame near Oxford, gave William Shakespeare an opening to become a professional actor.

== Life ==
Knell joined the Queen's Men in 1583. He seems to have quickly risen to play leading parts. He is known to have played the role of King Hevry V in the pre-Shakespeare play The Famous Victories of Henry V, opposite Richard Tarlton who played the clown role (Dericke) in the play. A record of the event says that "Knel, then playing Henry the fift, hit Tarlton a sound boxe indeed, which made the people laugh the more".

On 30 January 1586 he married the 15-year-old Rebecca Edwards (1561-1619).

On 13 June 1587, the Queen's Men were in Thame, at the beginning of a tour of the provinces, when he got into an argument with another actor called John Towne. Knell drew his sword and attacked Towne, who retreated to small ridge in a place called White Hound Close. As Knell approached Towne drew his own sword in self-defence and stabbed Knell in the neck. Knell was dead within half an hour. Towne was cleared at the subsequent inquest. The report states that "William Knell continuing his attack as before, so maliciously and furiously, and Towne... to save his life drew his sword of iron (price five shillings) and held it in his right hand and thrust it into the neck of William Knell and made a mortal wound three inches deep and one inch wide."

== Aftermath ==
Rebecca Knell was granted the administration of her late husband's estate in December 1587. She soon remarried, on 10 March 1588, to John Heminges, later to be one of Shakespeare's closest colleagues in the Chamberlain's Men and joint editor of the First Folio of his plays. By him she had several children during a marriage that lasted the thirty-one years until her death in 1619.

The death of Knell has provided a convenient explanation for how Shakespeare came into the acting profession. As Samuel Schoenbaum puts it, "When the Queen's Men stopped in Stratford in 1587, they were short a man, William Knell having been lately killed in a brawl with a fellow actor. Maybe Shakespeare took Knell's place and thus found his way to London and stage-land." Shakespeare's father, John Shakespeare, as High Bailiff of Stratford, was responsible for the acceptance and welfare of visiting theatrical troupes. However, there is no direct evidence of Shakespeare's membership of the Queen's Men, so it remains speculation.

== Tributes ==
Knell may be commemorated in Edmund Spenser's 1591 cycle of poems The Teares of the Muses, which includes the lines,

Our pleasant Willy, ah is dead of late:
With whom all joy and jolly merriment
Is also deaded, and in dolour drent.

Thomas Heywood mentions him with others in his Apology for Actors, as a modern Roscius whose fame outlived him. Though Heywood never saw him act, he says that those who saw him and the other actors he names believed their performances were so perfect ("absolute") that it would be a sin to "drown their worths in Lethe". He is also praised by Thomas Nashe in his book Pierce Penilesse (1592), in which Nashe jokingly says that he will write a book in Latin so that the achievements of Knell, Tarlton, Edward Alleyn, and John Bentley shall be recognised throughout Europe as surpassing those of famous ancient Roman actors.
