= William Adolphus Knell =

English painter

William Adolphus Knell (1801 – 9 July 1875) was an English painter who specialised in marine art.

== Life ==
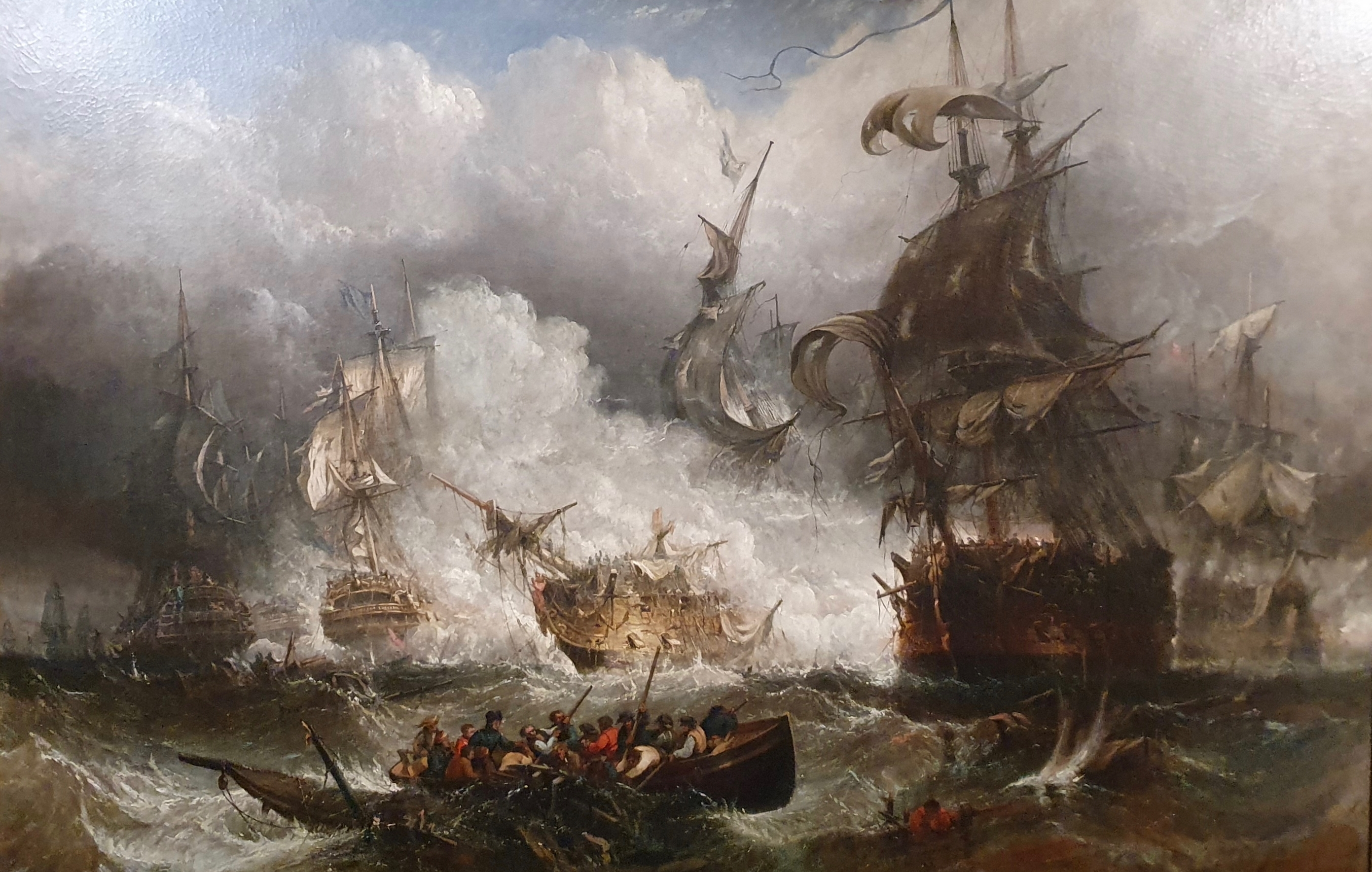
The Battle of Camperdown, William Adolphus Knell, pre-1875, National Museums Scotland

Knell was born in 1801 at Carisbrooke on the Isle of Wight. By 1825 had already exhibited his works at the Royal Academy. He soon built up a successful practice as a painter of maritime and particularly naval subjects, exhibiting regularly at the Royal Academy, British Institution and the Society of British Artists. He was particularly praised in 1847 for The Battle off Cape St. Vincent, 14 February 1797, shown at Westminster Hall in 1847. It was purchased for the nation for £200 and is now part of the Parliamentary Art Collection. Reviewing Knell's Destruction of Toulon, shown in the same exhibition, The Athenæum said: "It is more conspicuous in chiaroscuro treatment than most of the pictures here of its class ... a little less whiteness in the more intense portions of the fire would have given greater brilliancy. The handling is as vigorous and sketchy as the effect is powerful.

Knell was twice commissioned by Queen Victoria for paintings. His picture The Arrival of Prince Albert, 6 February 1840 was bought by the prince himself and remains in the Royal Collection. It shows the packet steamer Ariel, on board which Albert came to Britain for his wedding, approaching the crowded quay at Dover in a storm.

The returns of the 1861 Census record the family as living in St Pancras, London. William Adolphus, then aged 58 was married to Susan; his son William Calcott, aged 32 (b.c. 1829), was married to Maria and another son, Adolphus (b.c. 1849) was aged 12. Both William Calcott Knell and Adolphus Knell also became successful painters.

He died on 9 July 1875 at his home in Kentish Town and was buried at Abney Park Cemetery.

Both WA Knell and Adolphus painted a significant number of small picture of boats at dusk and in the moonlight. Many of these smaller pictures are on panel rather than on canvas which has the advantage that the harder surface allows for higher detail.

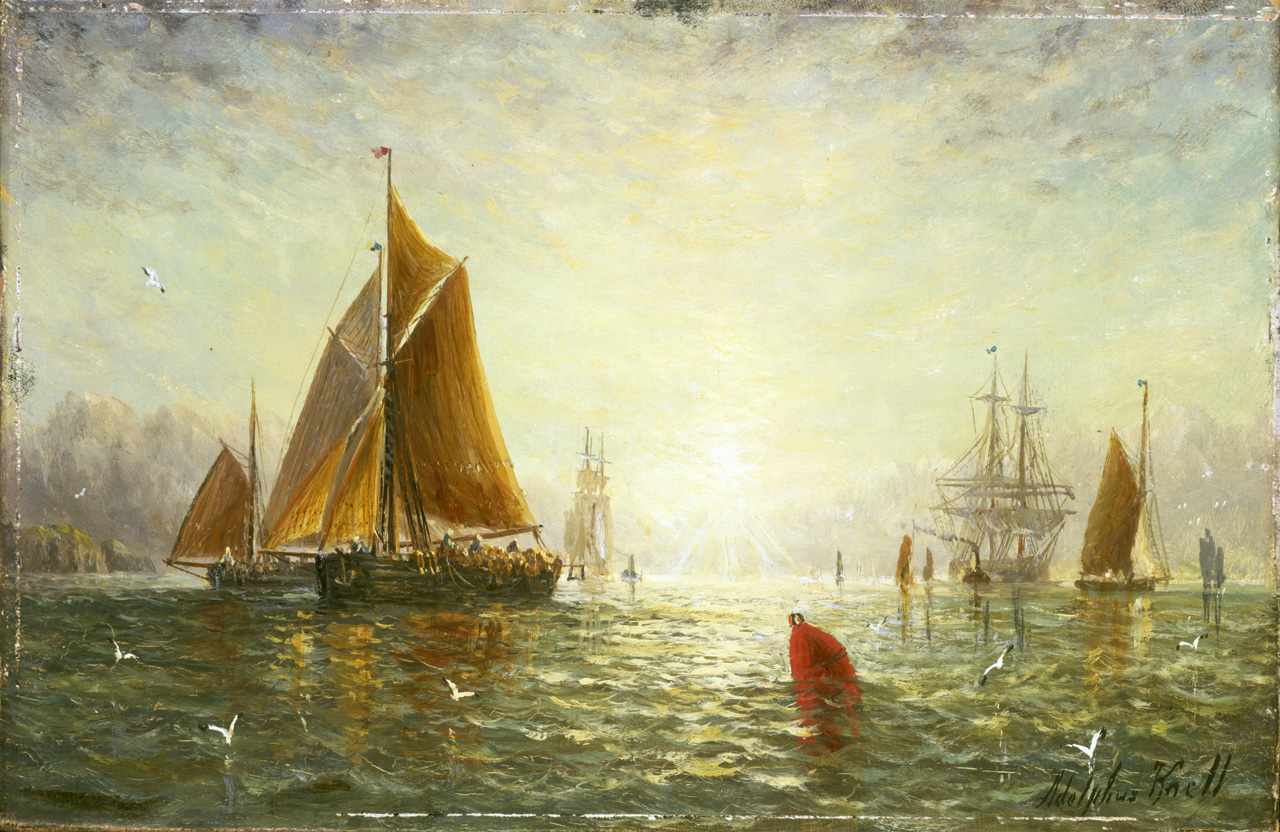
A Brixham trawler

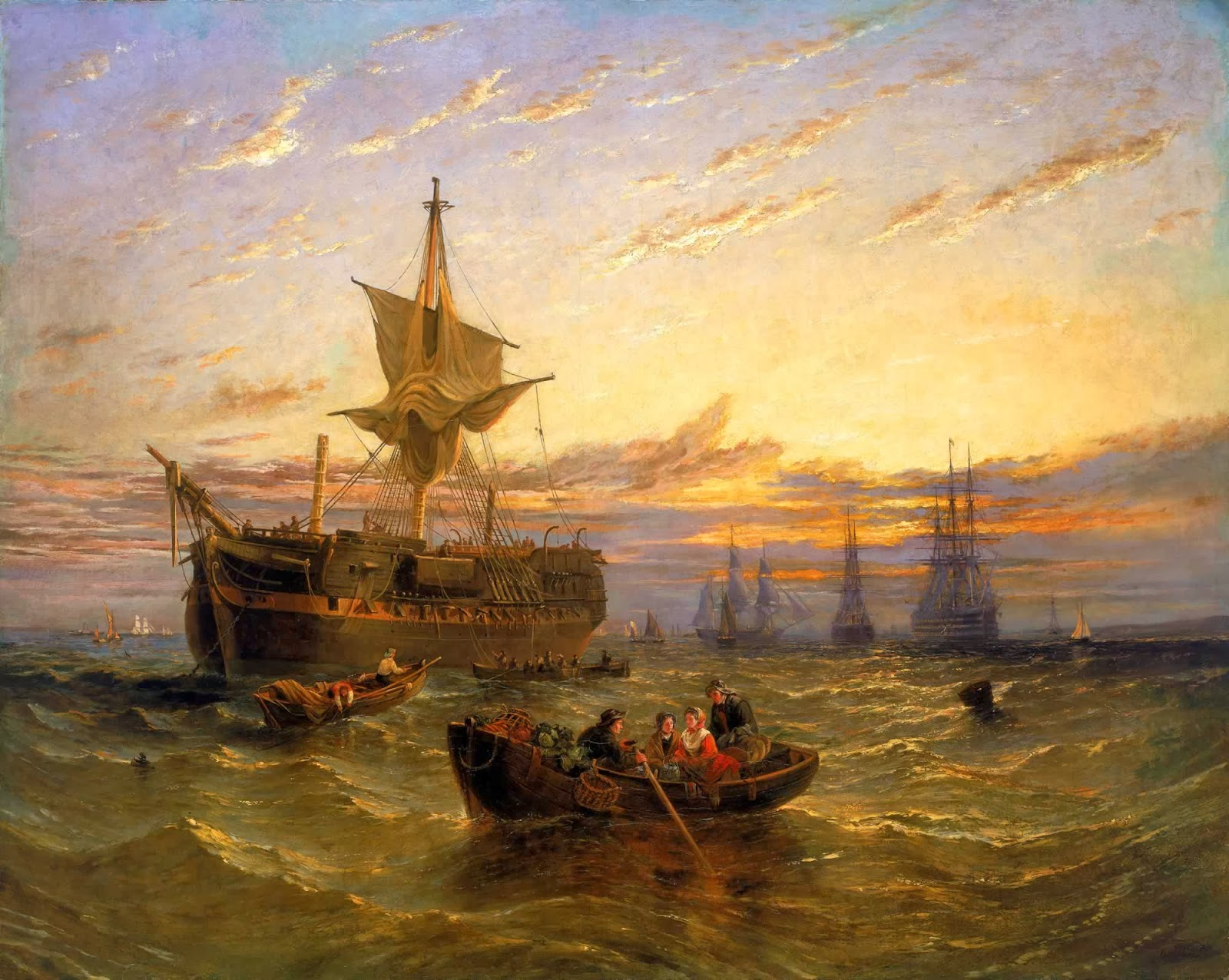
Indiamen in the Thames

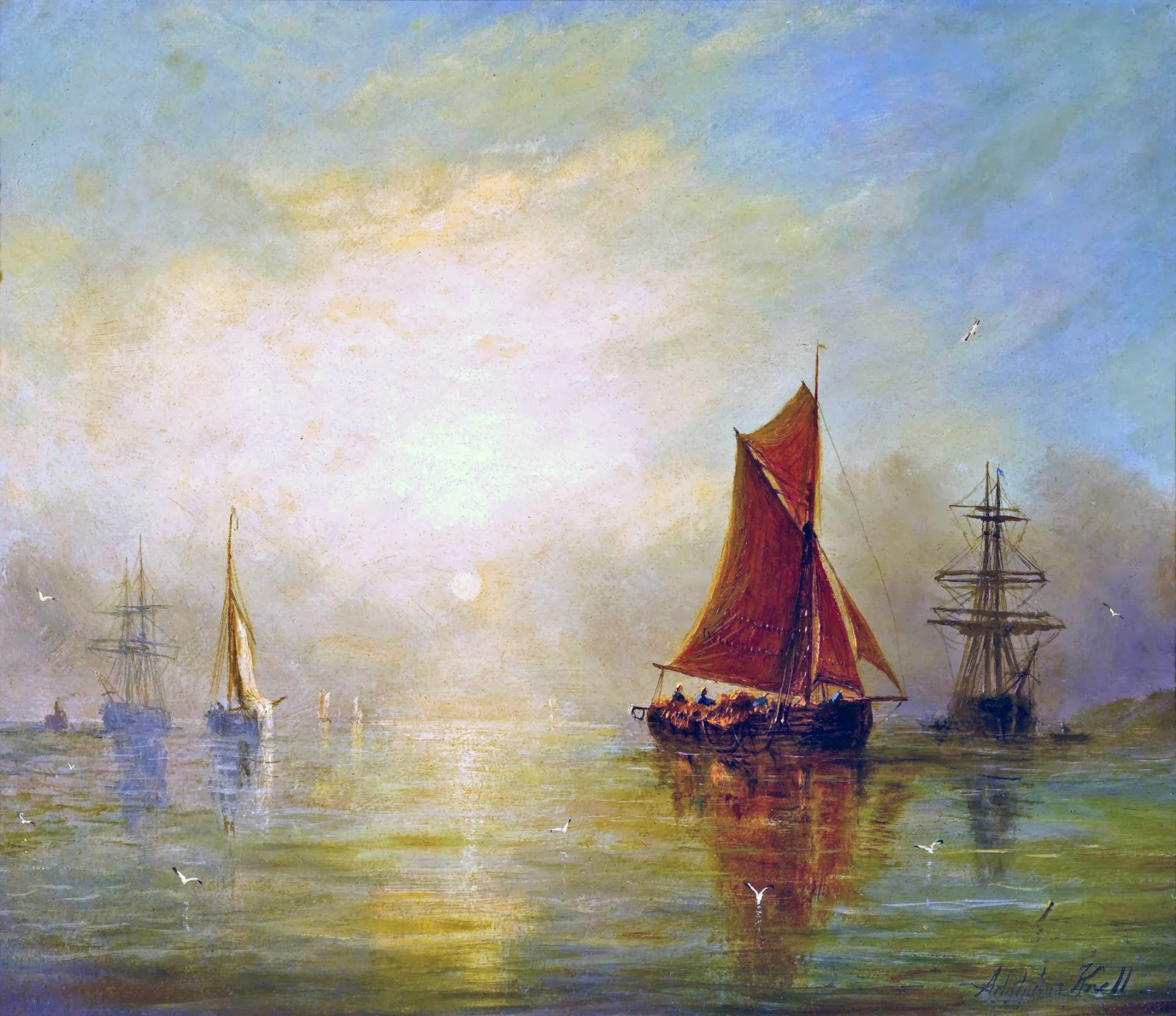
Fishing Boats in a Calm

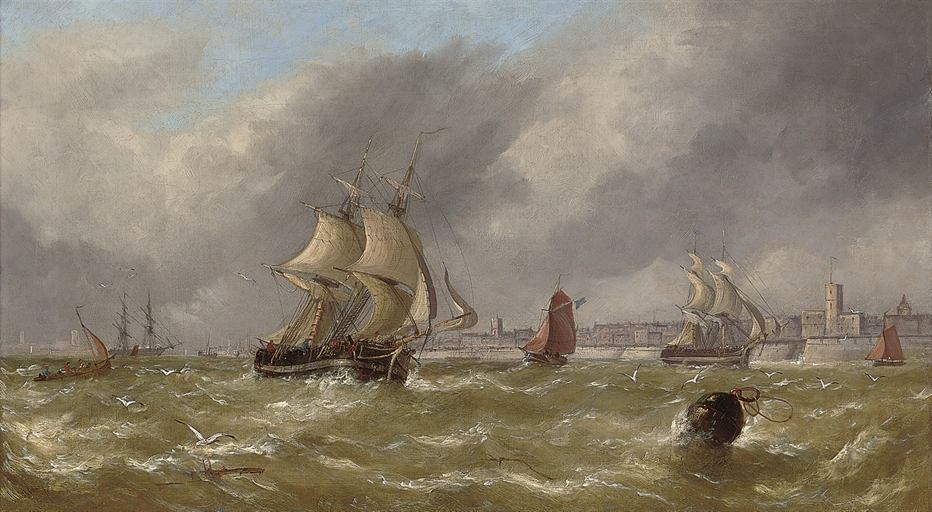
A fresh breeze off Portsmouth Harbour
