= William Calcott Knell =

British painter (1830–1880)

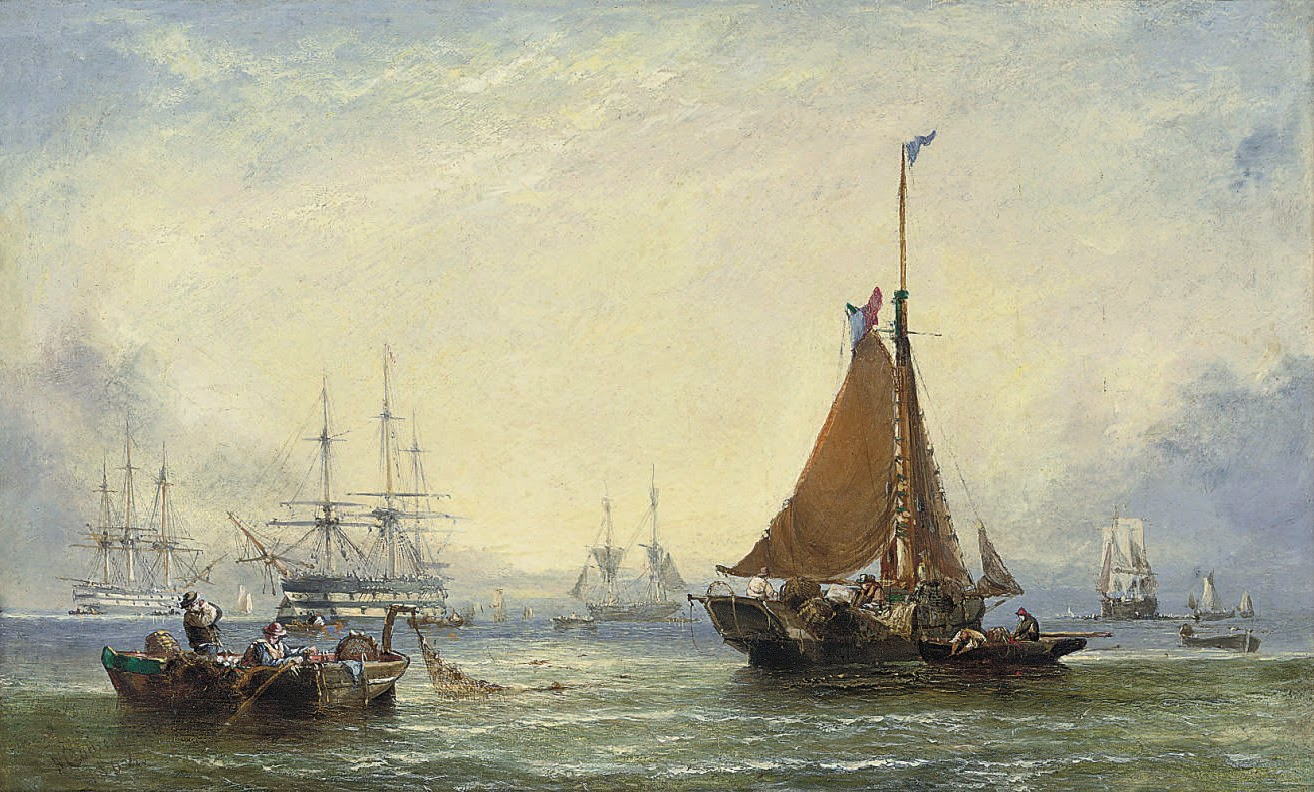
William Callcott Knell, 1862 - Fishermen drying their sails

William Calcott Knell (1830–1880) was a British painter of maritime subjects.

== Life ==
He was the son of William Adolphus Knell (1801-1875), who also worked as a marine painter. The influence of his father is evident in the composition and execution of his motifs. However, Knell was also inspired by other contemporaries. He painted mainly coastal scenes with boats. With great skill, Knell managed to capture the changing ambiances of the day and render his impressions of nature. Between 1848 and 1865, Knell showed his works at the Royal Academy, the Society of British Artists, and the British Institution.

== Works ==
His works include: Collier Brig Running before the Wind in a Fresh Breeze off Sheerness, Looking from Queensborough (c. 1860); Fishing Boats Hauling Nets near Lowestoft (1872); Fishing Boats off Harwich (1873); and Evening Oyster Boat off Southend Pier (1867).
